= Yttrium(III) chloride =

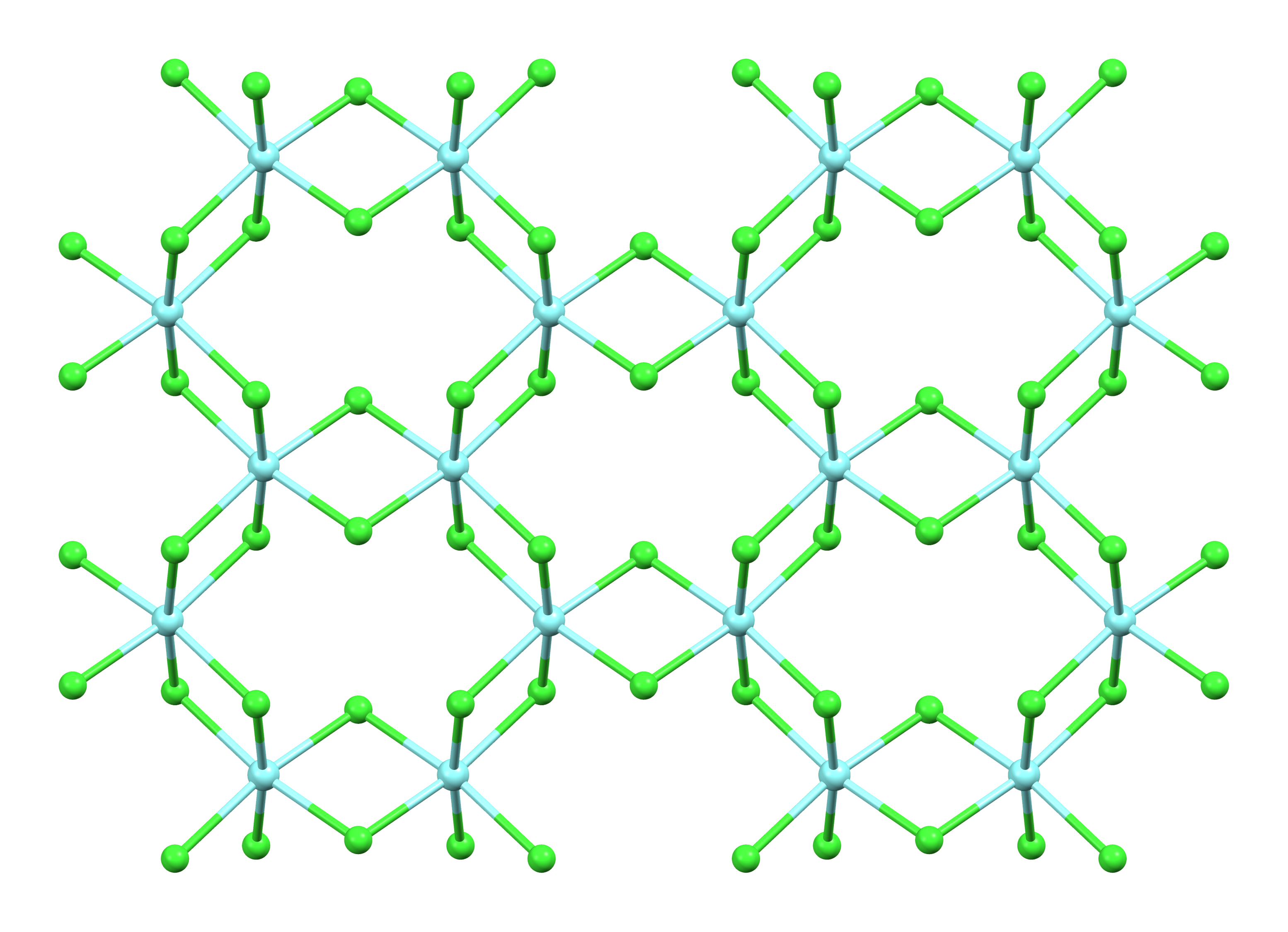
- Yttrium(III) chloride Part of a layer in the crystal structure of YCl_{3}

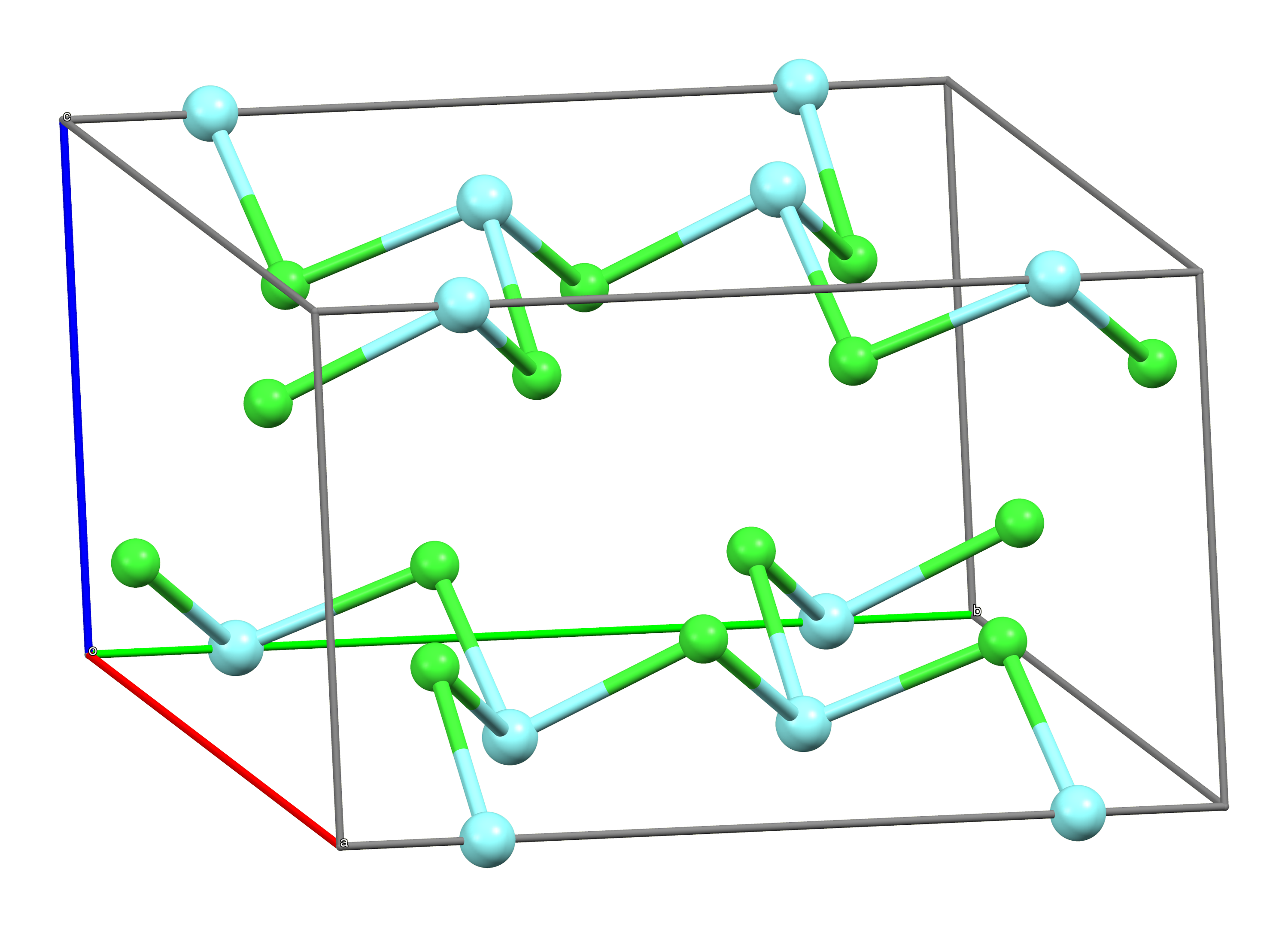
Unit cell
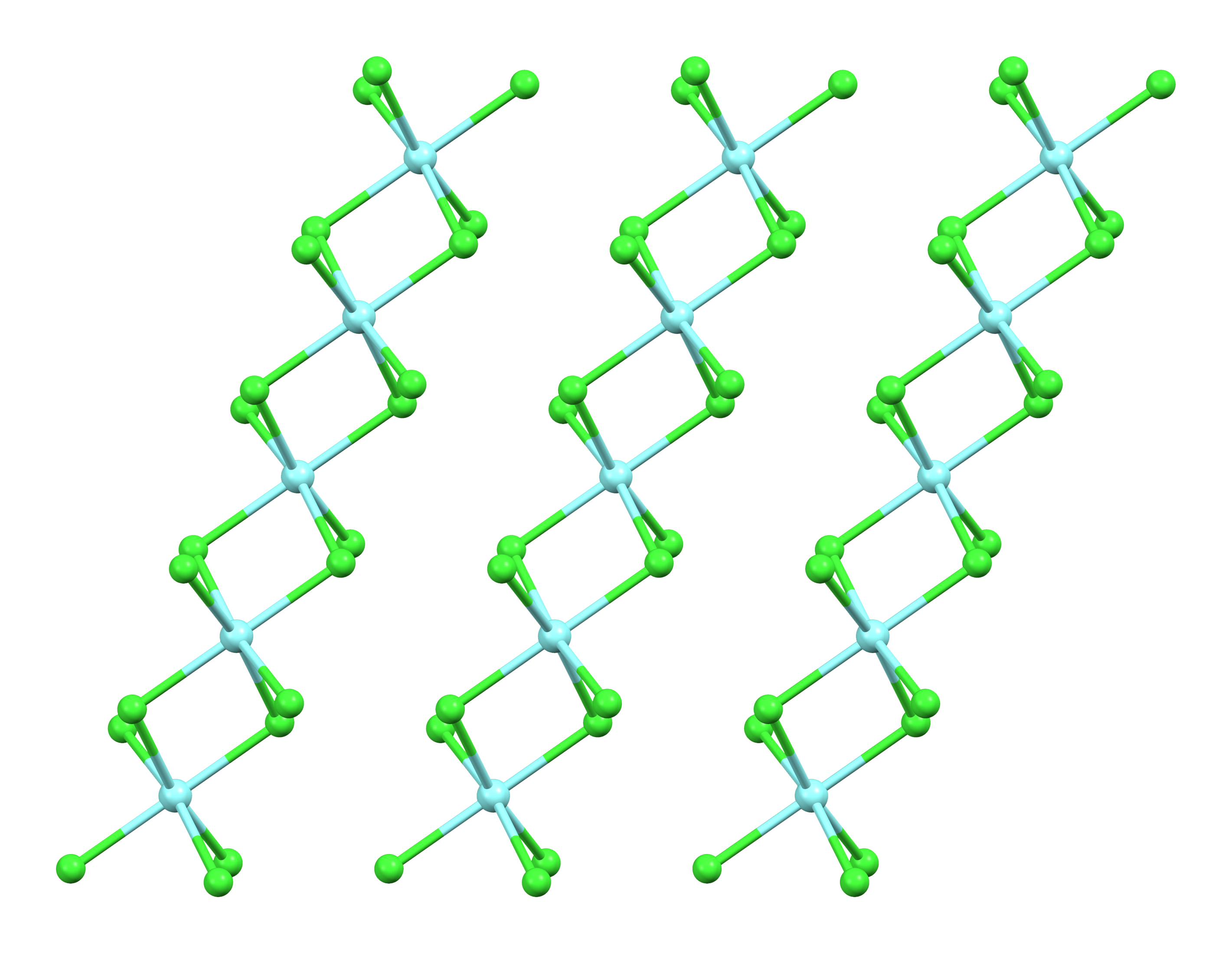
Layer packing

Names
- IUPAC names Yttrium(III) chloride Yttrium trichloride

Identifiers
CAS Number	10361-92-9
3D model (JSmol)	anhydrous: Interactive image; hexahydrate: Interactive image
ChemSpider	59696; hexahydrate: 175148
ECHA InfoCard	100.030.716
EC Number	hexahydrate: 233-801-0
PubChem CID	10198055; hexahydrate: 16211498
RTECS number	ZG3150000
UNII	11521XLD38
CompTox Dashboard (EPA)	DTXSID2042515
- InChI: InChI=1S/3ClH.Y/h3*1H;/q;;;+3/p-3 Key: PCMOZDDGXKIOLL-UHFFFAOYSA-K; InChI=1/3ClH.Y/h3*1H;/q;;;+3/p-3 Key: PCMOZDDGXKIOLL-DFZHHIFOAW; hexahydrate: InChI=1S/3ClH.6H2O.Y/h3*1H;6*1H2;/q;;;;;;;;;+3/p-3 Key: IINACGXCEZNYTF-UHFFFAOYSA-K
- SMILES: anhydrous: [Y+3].[Cl-].[Cl-].[Cl-]; hexahydrate: [OH2+][Y-3]([OH2+])([OH2+])([OH2+])([OH2+])[OH2+].[Cl-].[Cl-].[Cl-]

Properties
Chemical formula	YCl_{3}
Molar mass	195.265 g/mol
Appearance	white solid
Density	2.61 g/cm^{3}
Melting point	721 °C (1,330 °F; 994 K)
Boiling point	1,482 °C (2,700 °F; 1,755 K)
Solubility in water	751 g/L (20 °C)
Solubility	601 g/L ethanol (15 °C); 606 g/L pyridine (15 °C)

Structure
Crystal structure	Monoclinic, mS16
Space group	C2/m, No. 12
Lattice constant	a = 0.692 nm, b = 1.194 nm, c = 0.644 nm α = 90°, β = 111°, γ = 90°
Formula units (Z)	4

Hazards
- GHS labelling
Pictograms	(GHS07: Exclamation mark)
Signal word	Warning
Hazard statements	H315, H319, H335
Precautionary statements	P261, P264, P271, P280, P302+P352, P304+P340, P305+P351+P338, P312, P332+P313, P337+P313, P362
NFPA 704 (fire diamond)	1 0 0
Safety data sheet (SDS)	External MSDS

Related compounds
Other anions	Yttrium(III) fluoride Yttrium(III) bromide Yttrium(III) iodide
Other cations	Scandium(III) chloride Lutetium(III) chloride
- Except where otherwise noted, data are given for materials in their standard state (at 25 °C [77 °F], 100 kPa). verify (what is ?) Infobox references

Yttrium(III) chloride is an inorganic compound of yttrium and chloride. It exists in two forms, the hydrate (YCl_{3}(H_{2}O)_{6}) and an anhydrous form (YCl_{3}). Both are colourless salts that are highly soluble in water and deliquescent.

== Structure ==
Solid YCl_{3} adopts a cubic structure with close-packed chloride ions and yttrium ions filling one third of the octahedral holes and the resulting YCl_{6} octahedra sharing three edges with adjacent octahedra, giving it a layered structure. This structure is shared by a range of compounds, notably AlCl_{3}.

== Preparation and reactions ==
YCl_{3} is often prepared by the "ammonium chloride route," starting from either Y_{2}O_{3} or hydrated chloride or oxychloride. or YCl_{3}·6H_{2}O. These methods produce (NH_{4})_{2}[YCl_{5}]:

10 NH_{4}Cl + Y_{2}O_{3} → 2 (NH_{4})_{2}[YCl_{5}] + 6 NH_{3} + 3 H_{2}O

YCl_{3}·6H_{2}O + 2 NH_{4}Cl → (NH_{4})_{2}[YCl_{5}] + 6 H_{2}O

The pentachloride decomposes thermally according to the following equation:

(NH_{4})_{2}[YCl_{5}] → 2 NH_{4}Cl + YCl_{3}

The thermolysis reaction proceeds via the intermediacy of (NH_{4})[Y_{2}Cl_{7}].

Treating Y_{2}O_{3} with aqueous HCl produces the hydrated chloride (YCl_{3}·6H_{2}O). When heated, this salt yields yttrium oxychloride rather than reverting to the anhydrous form.

== Applications ==
Yttrium chloride is used to make nanocrystals doped with erbium (Er^{3+}) and ytterbium (Yb^{3+}), such as NaYF_{4}:Yb^{3+}/Er^{3+}.

In electronics and optics, YCl_{3} is added to semiconductors, LED materials, and lasers to enhance their performance and stability.
