= Scandium chloride =

Scandium(III) chloride
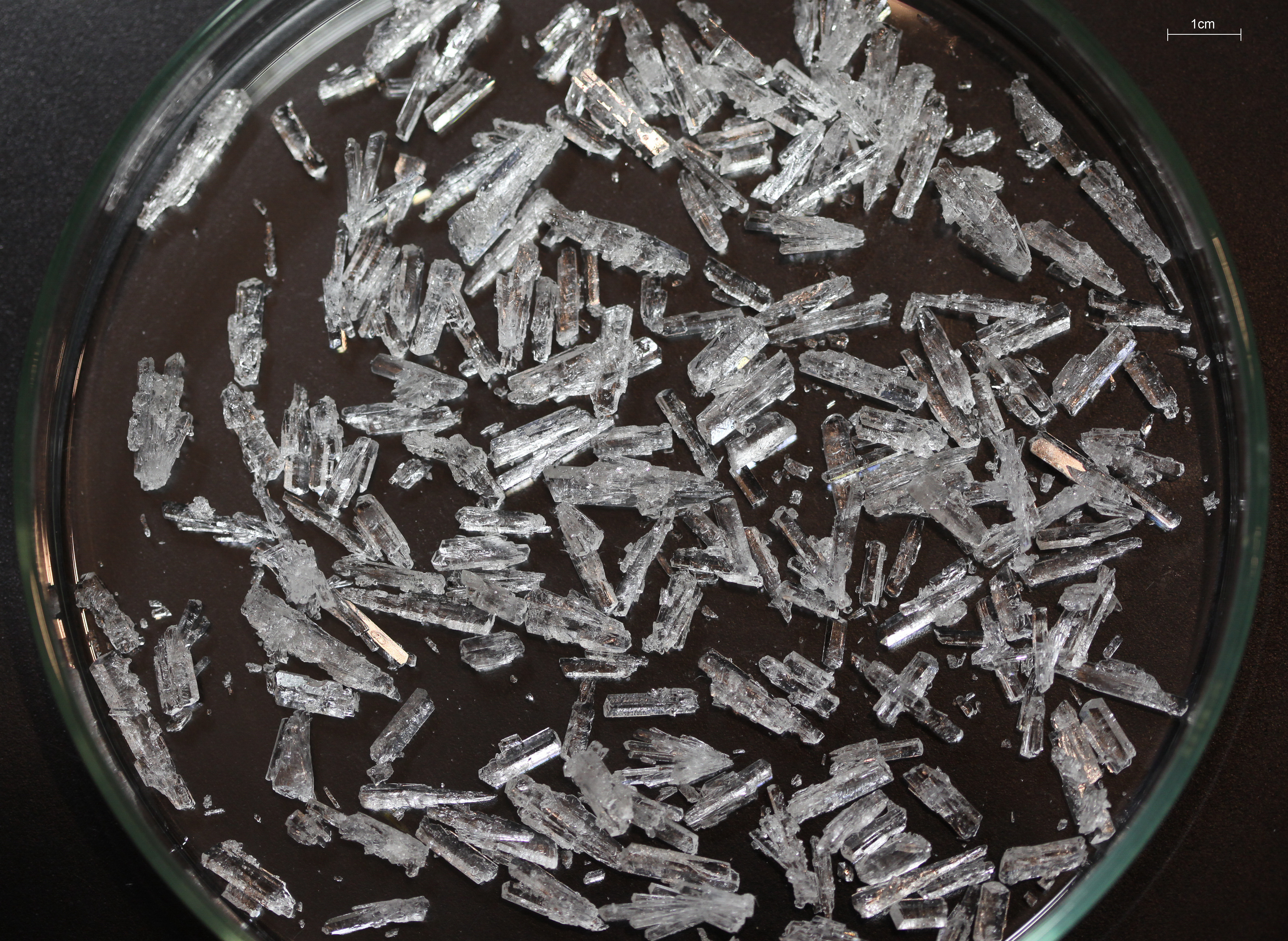
- Crystals of scandium(III) chloride hexahydrate

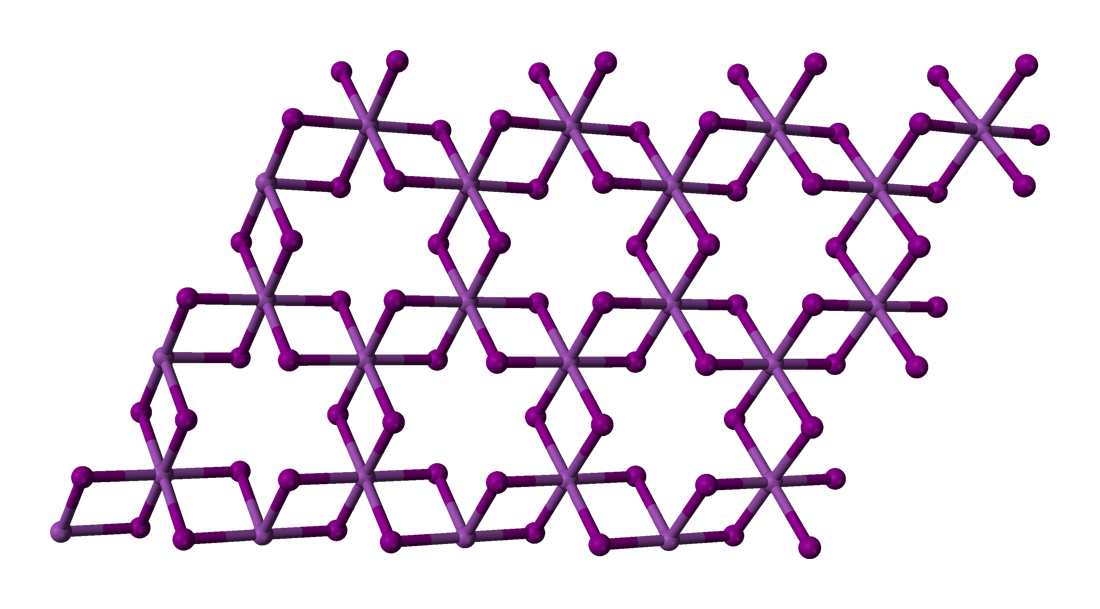

Names
- IUPAC name Scandium(III) chloride
- Other names: Scandium chloride; Scandium trichloride

Identifiers
CAS Number	10361-84-9
3D model (JSmol)	Interactive image
ChemSpider	74528
ECHA InfoCard	100.030.714
PubChem CID	82586
RTECS number	VQ8925000
UNII	53PH22NTYW
CompTox Dashboard (EPA)	DTXSID5042372
- InChI: InChI=1S/3ClH.Sc/h3*1H;/q;;;+3/p-3 Key: DVMZCYSFPFUKKE-UHFFFAOYSA-K; InChI=1/3ClH.Sc/h3*1H;/q;;;+3/p-3 Key: DVMZCYSFPFUKKE-DFZHHIFOAN; InChI=1S/3ClH.Sc/h3*1H;/q;;;+3/p-3 Key: DVMZCYSFPFUKKE-UHFFFAOYSA-K
- SMILES: Cl[Sc](Cl)Cl

Properties
Chemical formula	ScCl_{3}
Molar mass	151.31 g·mol^{−1}
Appearance	grayish-white crystals
Density	2.39 g/cm^{3}, solid
Melting point	960 °C (1,760 °F; 1,230 K); 63 °C (hexahydrate)
Solubility in water	70.2 g/100 mL
Solubility in other solvents	soluble in alcohol, acetone, glycerin insoluble in EtOH

Hazards
- Occupational safety and health (OHS/OSH)
Main hazards	irritant
NFPA 704 (fire diamond)	1 0
- Lethal dose or concentration (LD, LC)
LD_{50} (median dose)	3980 mg/kg (mouse, oral)
Safety data sheet (SDS)	External MSDS

Related compounds
Other anions	Scandium(III) fluoride; Scandium bromide; Scandium triiodide
Other cations	Yttrium(III) chloride; Lutetium(III) chloride; Aluminium chloride
Related compounds	Scandium(III) nitrate
- Except where otherwise noted, data are given for materials in their standard state (at 25 °C [77 °F], 100 kPa). verify (what is ?) Infobox references

Scandium(III) chloride is an inorganic scandium compound with the chemical formula ScCl_{3}. It is a white, high-melting ionic compound, which is deliquescent and highly water-soluble. This salt is mainly of interest in the research laboratory. Both the anhydrous form and hexahydrate (ScCl_{3}·6H_{2}O) are commercially available.

== Structure ==
ScCl_{3} crystallises in the layered BiI_{3} motif, which features octahedral scandium centres. Monomeric ScCl_{3} is the predominant species in the vapour phase at 900 K, the dimer Sc_{2}Cl_{6} accounts for approximately 8%. The electron diffraction spectrum indicates that the monomer is planar and the dimer has two bridging Cl atoms each Sc being 4 coordinate.

== Reactions ==
Structure of trans-[Sc(H_{2}O)_{4}Cl_{2}]^{+}.

ScCl_{3} is a Lewis acid that absorbs water to give aquo complexes. According to X-ray crystallogrphy, one such hydrate is [Sc(H_{2}O)_{7}]Cl_{3}, featuring seven-coordinate Sc^{3+}. The salt trans-[ScCl_{2}(H_{2}O)_{4}]Cl·2H_{2}O is also claimed. With the less basic ligand tetrahydrofuran, ScCl_{3} yields the adduct ScCl_{3}(THF)_{3} as white crystals. This THF-soluble complex is used in the synthesis of organoscandium compounds. ScCl_{3} has been converted to its dodecyl sulfate salt, which has been investigated as a "Lewis acid-surfactant combined catalyst" (LASC) in aldol-like reactions.

=== Reduction ===
Scandium(III) chloride was used by Fischer et al. who first prepared metallic scandium by electrolysis of a eutectic melt of scandium(III) chloride and other salts at 700-800 °C.

ScCl_{3} reacts with scandium metal to give a number of chlorides where scandium has an oxidation state of less than +3, ScCl, Sc_{7}Cl_{10}, Sc_{2}Cl_{3}, Sc_{5}Cl_{8} and Sc_{7}Cl_{12}. For example, reduction of ScCl_{3} with scandium metal in the presence of caesium chloride gives the compound CsScCl_{3} which contains linear chains of composition Sc^{II}Cl^{−}_{3}, containing Sc^{II}Cl_{6} octahedra sharing faces.

== Uses ==
Scandium(III) chloride is found in some halide lamps, optical fibers, electronic ceramics, and lasers.
