= Scandium nitrate =

Scandium(III) nitrate
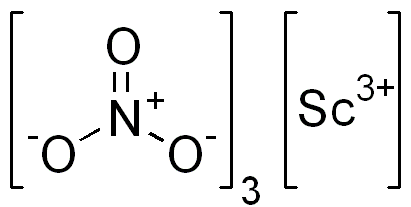
- Scandium(III) nitrate

Names
- IUPAC name scandium(3+) trinitrate

Identifiers
CAS Number	13465-60-6
3D model (JSmol)	Interactive image
ChEBI	CHEBI:231498
ChemSpider	145950
ECHA InfoCard	100.033.350
EC Number	236-701-5
PubChem CID	166818
UNII	PA4CJGPRTN
CompTox Dashboard (EPA)	DTXSID10890696
- InChI: InChI=1S/3NO3.Sc/c3*2-1(3)4;/q3*-1;+3 Key: DFCYEXJMCFQPPA-UHFFFAOYSA-N
- SMILES: [N+](=O)([O-])[O-].[N+](=O)([O-])[O-].[N+](=O)([O-])[O-].[Sc+3]

Properties
Chemical formula	Sc(NO_{3})_{3}
Molar mass	230.97 g/mol
Appearance	off-white crystals
Solubility in other solvents	water and strong mineral acids

Related compounds
Related compounds	Scandium(III) chloride Scandium(III) fluoride
- Except where otherwise noted, data are given for materials in their standard state (at 25 °C [77 °F], 100 kPa). verify (what is ?) Infobox references

Scandium(III) nitrate, Sc(NO_{3})_{3}, is an ionic compound. It is an oxidizer, as all nitrates are. The salt is applied in optical coatings, catalysts, electronic ceramics and the laser industry.

== Preparation ==
Scandium nitrate can be prepared by the reaction between scandium metal with dinitrogen tetroxide.

Sc + 3 N_{2}O_{4} → Sc(NO_{3})_{3} + 3 NO

The anhydrous form can also be obtained by the reaction between scandium chloride and dinitrogen pentoxide. The tetrahydrate can be obtained from the reaction between scandium hydroxide and nitric acid.

== Properties ==
Scandium nitrate is a white solid which dissolves in water and ethanol. It has multiple hydrated forms, including the dihydrate, trihydrate, and tetrahydrate. The tri- and tetrahydrate exist in the monoclinic crystal system. Upon heating in air to 50 °C, the tetrahydrate transforms into the dihydrate, which at 60 °C further converts to Sc_{4}O_{3}(NO_{3})_{3}·6.5H_{2}O. At 140–220 °C, Sc_{4}O_{5}(NO_{3})_{3} is formed.

Scandium nitrate has been found to form clusters when in an aqueous solution which can affect its behavior and properties in various ways. Small Angle neutron scattering has been used in experiments to show the clusters can contain as many as 10 scandium ions. This number depends on the concentration of the original scandium nitrate in the solution.

== Applications ==
Scandium nitrate has been found to be a successful catalyst in chemical reactions such as Beckmann rearrangement of ketoximes to amides and the isomerization of allylic alcohols to aldehydes. The catalytic success of scandium nitrate can be increased by modifying its structure in ways such as adding a co catalyst. Scandium nitrate is also the precursor for the synthesis of other scandium based compounds such as scandium oxide or scandium hydroxide. Scandium nitrate has also been investigated for its potential in luminescent materials due to its ability to strongly emit in the blue region of the spectrum.
