= Scandium =

Scandium, _{21}Sc
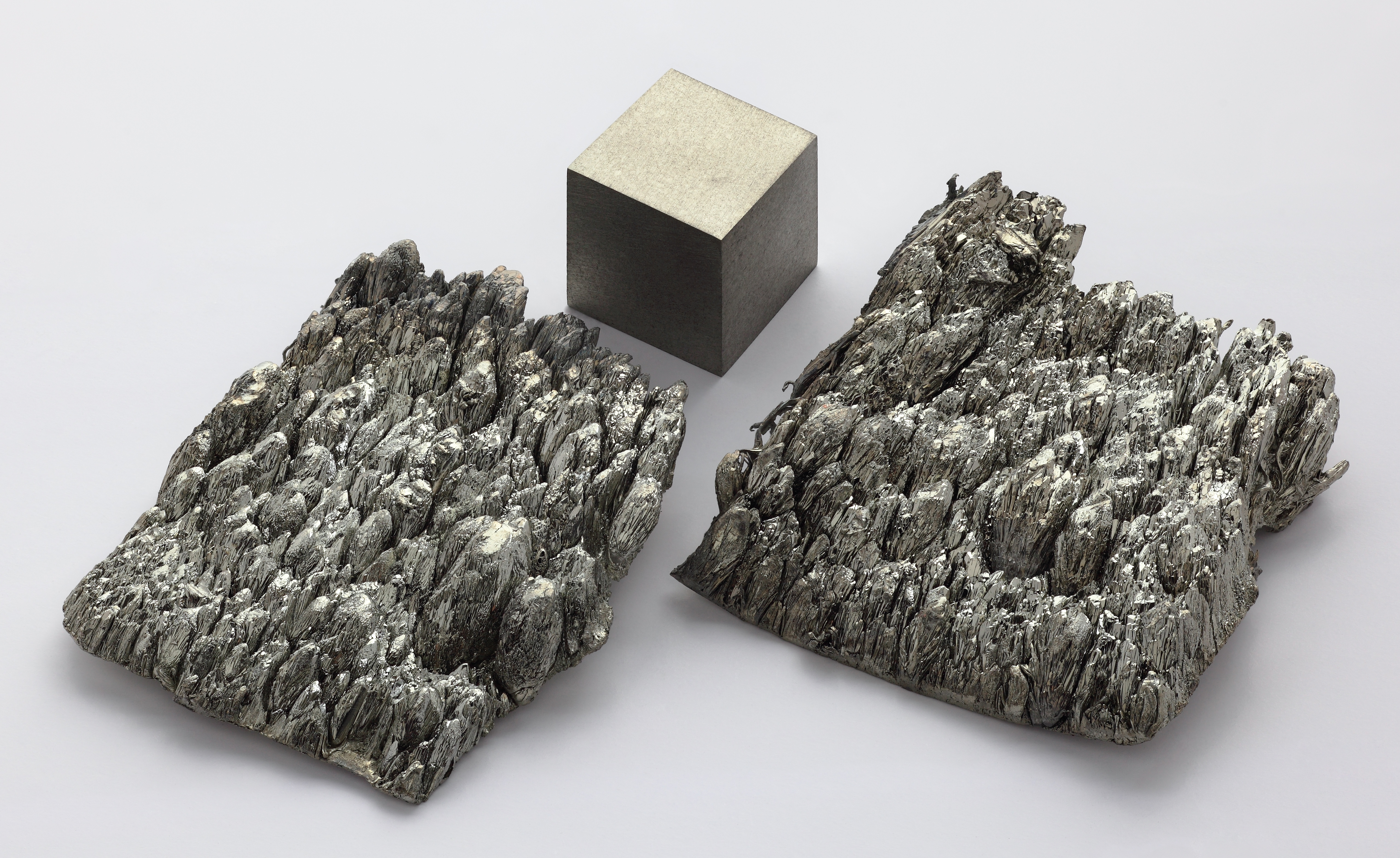

Scandium
- Pronunciation: /ˈskændiəm/ (SKAN-dee-əm)
- Appearance: silvery white

Standard atomic weight A_{r}°(Sc)
- 44.955907±0.000004; 44.956±0.001 (abridged)

Scandium in the periodic table
Hydrogen																															Helium
Lithium	Beryllium																									Boron	Carbon	Nitrogen	Oxygen	Fluorine	Neon
Sodium	Magnesium																									Aluminium	Silicon	Phosphorus	Sulfur	Chlorine	Argon
Potassium	Calcium															Scandium	Titanium	Vanadium	Chromium	Manganese	Iron	Cobalt	Nickel	Copper	Zinc	Gallium	Germanium	Arsenic	Selenium	Bromine	Krypton
Rubidium	Strontium															Yttrium	Zirconium	Niobium	Molybdenum	Technetium	Ruthenium	Rhodium	Palladium	Silver	Cadmium	Indium	Tin	Antimony	Tellurium	Iodine	Xenon
Caesium	Barium	Lanthanum	Cerium	Praseodymium	Neodymium	Promethium	Samarium	Europium	Gadolinium	Terbium	Dysprosium	Holmium	Erbium	Thulium	Ytterbium	Lutetium	Hafnium	Tantalum	Tungsten	Rhenium	Osmium	Iridium	Platinum	Gold	Mercury (element)	Thallium	Lead	Bismuth	Polonium	Astatine	Radon
Francium	Radium	Actinium	Thorium	Protactinium	Uranium	Neptunium	Plutonium	Americium	Curium	Berkelium	Californium	Einsteinium	Fermium	Mendelevium	Nobelium	Lawrencium	Rutherfordium	Dubnium	Seaborgium	Bohrium	Hassium	Meitnerium	Darmstadtium	Roentgenium	Copernicium	Nihonium	Flerovium	Moscovium	Livermorium	Tennessine	Oganesson
–
↑
Sc
↓
Y
calcium ← scandium → titanium
- Atomic number (Z): 21
- Group: group 3
- Period: period 4
- Block: d-block
- Electron configuration: [Ar] 3d^{1} 4s^{2}
- Electrons per shell: 2, 8, 9, 2

Physical properties
- Phase at STP: solid
- Melting point: 1814 K (1541 °C, 2806 °F)
- Boiling point: 3109 K (2836 °C, 5136 °F)
- Density (at 20° C): 2.989 g/cm^{3}
- when liquid (at m.p.): 2.80 g/cm^{3}
- Heat of fusion: 14.1 kJ/mol
- Heat of vaporization: 332.7 kJ/mol
- Molar heat capacity: 25.52 J/(mol·K)
- Specific heat capacity: 567.666 J/(kg·K)
Vapor pressure
P (Pa)	1	10	100	1 k	10 k	100 k
at T (K)	1645	1804	(2006)	(2266)	(2613)	(3101)

Atomic properties
- Oxidation states: common: +3; 0, +1, +2
- Electronegativity: Pauling scale: 1.36
- Ionization energies: 1st: 633.1 kJ/mol; 2nd: 1235.0 kJ/mol; 3rd: 2388.6 kJ/mol; (more)
- Atomic radius: empirical: 162 pm
- Covalent radius: 170±7 pm
- Van der Waals radius: 211 pm
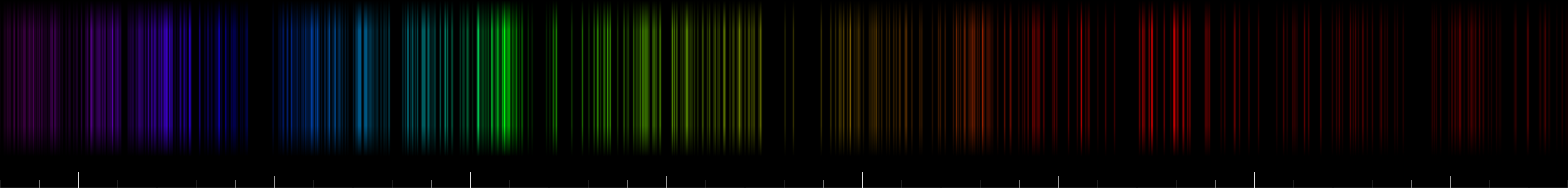
- Spectral lines of scandium

Other properties
- Natural occurrence: primordial
- Crystal structure: hexagonal close-packed (hcp) (hP2)
- Lattice constants: a = 330.89 pm c = 526.80 pm (at 20 °C)
- Thermal expansion: 9.97×10^{−6}/K (at 20 °C) (Note: The thermal expansion of scandium is anisotropic: the coefficients for each crystal axis are (at 20 °C): α_{a} = 7.98×10^{−6}/K, α_{c} = 13.94×10^{−6}/K, and α_{average} = α_{V}/3 = 9.97×10^{−6}/K.)
- Thermal conductivity: 15.8 W/(m⋅K)
- Electrical resistivity: α, poly: 562 nΩ⋅m (at r.t., calculated)
- Magnetic ordering: paramagnetic
- Molar magnetic susceptibility: +315.0×10^{−6} cm^{3}/mol (292 K)
- Young's modulus: 74.4 GPa
- Shear modulus: 29.1 GPa
- Bulk modulus: 56.6 GPa
- Poisson ratio: 0.279
- Brinell hardness: 736–1200 MPa
- CAS Number: 7440-20-2

History
- Naming: after Scandinavia
- Prediction: Dmitri Mendeleev (1871)
- Discovery: Lars Fredrik Nilson (1879)
- First isolation: W. Fischer, K. Brünger, H. Grieneisen (1937)

Isotopes of scandium
Main isotopes			Decay	
Isotope	abundance	half-life (t_{1/2})	mode	product
^{43}Sc	synth	3.891 h	β^{+}	^{43}Ca
^{44}Sc	synth	4.042 h	β^{+}	^{44}Ca
^{44m3}Sc	synth	58.61 h	IT	^{44}Sc
^{44m3}Sc	synth	58.61 h	β^{+}	^{44}Ca
^{45}Sc	100%	stable		
^{46}Sc	synth	83.757 d	β^{−}	^{46}Ti
^{47}Sc	synth	3.3492 d	β^{−}	^{47}Ti
^{48}Sc	synth	43.67 h	β^{−}	^{48}Ti

Scandium is a chemical element; it has symbol Sc and atomic number 21. It is a silvery-white metallic element found in the d-block of the periodic table. Usually, it is classified as a rare-earth element, together with yttrium and the lanthanides. It was discovered in 1879 by spectral analysis of the minerals euxenite and gadolinite from Scandinavia.

Scandium is present in most of the deposits of rare-earth and uranium compounds, but it is extracted from these ores in only a few mines worldwide. Due to its low availability and difficulties in the preparation of metallic scandium, first done in 1937, applications for scandium were not developed until the 1970s, when the positive effects of scandium on aluminium alloys were discovered. Its use in such alloys remains its only major application. The global trade of scandium oxide is 15–20 tonnes per year.

The properties of scandium compounds are intermediate between those of aluminium and yttrium. A diagonal relationship exists between the behavior of magnesium and scandium, just as there is between beryllium and aluminium. In the chemical compounds of the elements in group 3, the predominant oxidation state is +3.

== Properties ==
=== Chemical characteristics ===
Scandium is a soft metal with a silvery appearance. It develops a slightly yellowish or pinkish cast when oxidized by air. It is susceptible to weathering and dissolves slowly in most dilute acids. It does not dissolve in a 1:1 mixture of nitric acid (HNO_{3}) and 48.0% hydrofluoric acid (HF), possibly due to the formation of an impermeable passive layer. Scandium turnings ignite in the air with a brilliant yellow flame to form scandium oxide.

=== Isotopes ===
In nature, scandium is found exclusively as the isotope ^{45}Sc, which has a nuclear spin of 7/2; this is its only stable isotope.

The known isotopes of scandium range from ^{37}Sc to ^{63}Sc, and the most stable radioisotopes are ^{46}Sc with a half-life of 83.76 days, ^{47}Sc with a half-life of 3.3492 days, ^{48}Sc at 43.67 hours, ^{44}Sc at 4.042 hours, and ^{43}Sc at 3.891 hours. All others have half-lives shorter than an hour, and the majority of these shorter than 15 seconds. The most stable meta state is ^{44m3}Sc with half-life 58.6 hours; this is the lightest isotope with a long-lived isomer.

The low mass isotopes are very difficult to create. The initial detection of ^{37}Sc and ^{38}Sc only resulted in the characterization of their mass excess.

The primary decay mode of ground-state scandium isotopes at masses lower than the only stable isotope, ^{45}Sc, is electron capture (or positron emission), but the lightest isotopes (^{37}Sc to ^{39}Sc) undergo proton emission instead, all three of these producing calcium isotopes. The primary decay mode for heavier isotopes is beta emission, producing titanium isotopes.

=== Occurrence ===
In Earth's crust, scandium is not rare. Estimates vary from 18 to 25 ppm, which is comparable to the abundance of cobalt (20–30 ppm). Scandium is only the 50th most common element on Earth (35th most abundant element in the crust), but it is the 23rd most common element in the Sun and the 26th most abundant element in the stars. However, scandium is distributed sparsely and occurs in trace amounts in many minerals. Rare minerals from Scandinavia and Madagascar such as thortveitite, euxenite, and gadolinite are the only known concentrated sources of this element, all of which are sources of other rare earths. Thortveitite can contain up to 45% scandium oxide.

The stable form of scandium is created in supernovae via the r-process. Also, scandium is created by cosmic ray spallation of the more abundant iron-peak nuclei. Example reactions are:

- ^{28}Si + 17 n → ^{45}Sc (r-process)
- ^{56}Fe + p → ^{45}Sc + ^{11}C + n (cosmic ray spallation)

== Production ==
The world production of scandium is in the order of 15–20 tonnes per year, in the form of scandium oxide. The demand is slightly higher, and both the production and demand keep increasing. In 2003, only three mines produced scandium: the uranium and iron mines in Zhovti Vody in Ukraine, the rare-earth mines in Bayan Obo, China, and the apatite mines in the Kola Peninsula, Russia. Since then, many other countries have built scandium-producing facilities, including 5 tonnes/year (7.5 tonnes/year Sc_{2}O_{3}) by Nickel Asia Corporation and Sumitomo Metal Mining in the Philippines. In the United States, NioCorp Development hopes to raise $1 billion toward opening a niobium mine at its Elk Creek site in southeast Nebraska, which may be able to produce as much as 95 tonnes of scandium oxide annually. In each case, scandium is a byproduct of the extraction of other elements and is sold as scandium oxide.

To produce metallic scandium, the oxide is converted to scandium fluoride and then reduced with metallic calcium.

- Sc_{2}O_{3} + 6 HF → 2 ScF_{3} + 3 H_{2}O
- 2 ScF_{3} + 3 Ca → 3 CaF_{2} + 2 Sc

Madagascar and the Iveland Municipality–Evje og Hornnes Municipality region in Norway have the only deposits of minerals with high scandium content, thortveitite (Sc,Y)_{2}(Si_{2}O_{7}), but these are not being exploited. The mineral kolbeckite ScPO_{4}·2H_{2}O has a very high scandium content but is not available in any larger deposits.

The absence of reliable, secure, stable, long-term production has limited the commercial applications of scandium. Despite this low level of use, scandium offers significant benefits. Particularly promising is the strengthening of aluminium alloys with as little as 0.5% scandium. Scandium-stabilized zirconia enjoys a growing market demand for use as a high-efficiency electrolyte in solid oxide fuel cells.

The USGS reports that, from 2015 to 2019 in the US, the price of small quantities of scandium ingot has been $107 to $134 per gram, and that of scandium oxide $4 to $5 per gram. In August 2026, the U.S. Office of Strategic Capital committed a conditional US$400 million loan to Sunrise Energy Metals to construct the Syerston Project in New South Wales, planned as a primary scandium operation yielding 60 tonnes of scandium oxide annually.

== Compounds ==
Scandium chemistry is almost completely dominated by the trivalent ion, Sc^{3+}. The radii of M^{3+} ions in the table below indicate that the chemical properties of scandium ions have more in common with yttrium ions than with aluminium ions. In part because of this similarity, scandium is often classified as a lanthanide-like element.

Ionic radius (pm)
Al	Sc	Y	La	Lu
53.5	74.5	90.0	103.2	86.1

=== Oxides and hydroxides ===
The oxide Sc_{2}O_{3} and the hydroxide Sc(OH)_{3} are amphoteric:

Sc(OH)_{3} + 3 OH^{−} → [Sc(OH)_{6}]^{3−} (scandate ion)
Sc(OH)_{3} + 3 H^{+} + 3 H_{2}O → [Sc(H_{2}O)_{6}]^{3+}

α- and γ-ScOOH are isostructural with their aluminium hydroxide oxide counterparts. Solutions of Sc^{3+} in water are acidic due to hydrolysis.

=== Halides and pseudohalides ===
The halides ScX_{3}, where X= Cl, Br, or I, are very soluble in water, but ScF_{3} is insoluble. In all four halides, the scandium is 6-coordinated. The halides are Lewis acids; for example, ScF_{3} dissolves in a solution containing excess fluoride ion to form ScF_{6}^{3−}. The coordination number 6 is typical for Sc(III). In the larger Y^{3+} and La^{3+} ions, coordination numbers of 8 and 9 are common. Scandium triflate is sometimes used as a Lewis acid catalyst in organic chemistry.

=== Organic derivatives ===
Scandium forms a series of organometallic compounds with cyclopentadienyl ligands (Cp), similar to the behavior of the lanthanides. One example is the chlorine-bridged dimer, (ScCp_{2}Cl)_{2} and related derivatives of pentamethylcyclopentadienyl ligands.

=== Uncommon oxidation states ===
Compounds that feature scandium in oxidation states other than +3 are rare but well characterized. The blue-black compound CsScCl_{3} is one of the simplest. This material adopts a sheet-like structure that exhibits extensive bonding between the scandium(II) centers. Scandium hydride is not well understood, although it appears not to be a saline hydride of Sc(II). As is observed for most elements, a diatomic scandium hydride has been observed spectroscopically at high temperatures in the gas phase. Scandium borides and carbides are non-stoichiometric, as is typical for neighboring elements.

Lower oxidation states (+2, +1, 0) have also been observed in organoscandium compounds.

== History ==
Dmitri Mendeleev, who is referred to as the father of the periodic table, predicted the existence of an element ekaboron, with an atomic mass between 40 and 48 in 1869. Lars Fredrik Nilson and his team detected this element in the minerals euxenite and gadolinite in 1879. Nilson prepared 2 grams of scandium oxide of high purity. He named the element scandium, from the Latin Scandia meaning "Scandinavia". Nilson was apparently unaware of Mendeleev's prediction, but Per Teodor Cleve recognized the correspondence and notified Mendeleev.

Metallic scandium was produced for the first time in 1937 by electrolysis of a eutectic mixture of potassium, lithium, and scandium chlorides, at 700–800 °C. The first pound of 99% pure scandium metal was produced in 1960. Production of aluminium alloys began in 1971, following a US patent. Aluminium-scandium alloys were also developed in the USSR.

Laser crystals of gadolinium-scandium-gallium garnet (GSGG) were used in strategic defense applications developed for the Strategic Defense Initiative (SDI) in the 1980s and 1990s.

== Applications ==
=== Aluminium alloys ===
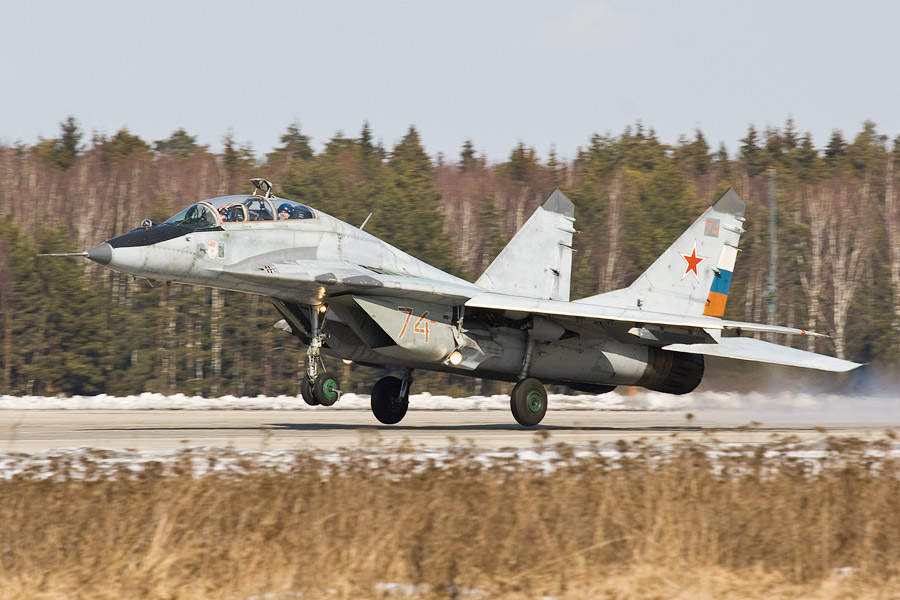
Parts of the MiG-29 are made from Al-Sc alloy.

The main application of scandium by weight is in aluminium-scandium alloys for minor aerospace industry components. These alloys contain between 0.1% and 0.5% of scandium. They were used in Russian military aircraft, specifically the Mikoyan-Gurevich MiG-21 and MiG-29.

The addition of scandium to aluminium limits the grain growth in the heat zone of welded aluminium components. This has two beneficial effects: the precipitated Al_{3}Sc forms smaller crystals than in other aluminium alloys, and the volume of precipitate-free zones at the grain boundaries of age-hardening aluminium alloys is reduced. The Al_{3}Sc precipitate is a coherent precipitate that strengthens the aluminum matrix by applying elastic strain fields that inhibit dislocation movement (i.e., plastic deformation). Al_{3}Sc has an equilibrium L1_{2} superlattice structure exclusive to this system.

A fine dispersion of nano scale precipitate can be achieved via heat treatment that can also strengthen the alloys through order hardening. Recent developments include the additions of transition metals such as zirconium (Zr) and rare earth metals like erbium (Er) produce shells surrounding the spherical Al_{3}Sc precipitate that reduce coarsening.

These shells are dictated by the diffusivity of the alloying element and lower the cost of the alloy due to less Sc being substituted in part by Zr while maintaining stability and less Sc being needed to form the precipitate. These have made Al_{3}Sc somewhat competitive with titanium alloys along with a wide array of applications. However, titanium alloys, which are similar in lightness and strength, are cheaper and much more widely used.

The alloy Al_{20}Li_{20}Mg_{10}Sc_{20}Ti_{30} is as strong as titanium, light as aluminium, and hard as some ceramics.

Some items of sports equipment, which rely on lightweight high-performance materials, have been made with scandium-aluminium alloys, including baseball bats, tent poles and bicycle frames and components. Lacrosse sticks are also made with scandium. The American firearm manufacturing company Smith & Wesson produces semi-automatic pistols and revolvers with frames of scandium alloy and cylinders of titanium or carbon steel.

Since 2013, Apworks GmbH, a spin-off of Airbus, have marketed a high strength Scandium containing aluminium alloy processed using metal 3D-Printing (Laser Powder Bed Fusion) under the trademark Scalmalloy which claims very high strength & ductility.

=== Light sources ===
The first scandium-based metal-halide lamps were patented by General Electric and made in North America, although they are now produced in all major industrialized countries. Approximately 20 kg of scandium (as Sc_{2}O_{3}) is used annually in the United States for high-intensity discharge lamps. One type of metal-halide lamp, similar to the mercury-vapor lamp, is made from scandium triiodide and sodium iodide. This lamp is a white-light source with high color rendering index that sufficiently resembles sunlight to allow good color-reproduction with TV cameras. About 80 kg of scandium is used in metal-halide lamps/light bulbs globally per year.

Dentists use erbium-chromium-doped yttrium-scandium-gallium garnet (Er,Cr:YSGG) lasers for cavity preparation and in endodontics.

=== Other ===
The radioactive isotope ^{46}Sc is used in oil refineries as a tracing agent. Scandium triflate is a catalytic Lewis acid used in organic chemistry.

The 12.4 keV nuclear transition of ^{45}Sc has been studied as a reference for timekeeping applications, with a theoretical precision as much as three orders of magnitude better than the current caesium reference clocks.

Scandium has been proposed for use in solid oxide fuel cells (SOFCs) as a dopant in the electrolyte material, typically zirconia (ZrO₂). Scandium oxide (Sc₂O₃) is one of several possible additives to enhance the ionic conductivity of the zirconia, improving the overall thermal stability, performance and efficiency of the fuel cell. This application would be particularly valuable in clean energy technologies, as SOFCs can utilize a variety of fuels and have high energy conversion efficiencies.

== Health and safety ==
Elemental scandium is considered non-toxic, though extensive animal testing of scandium compounds has not been done. The median lethal dose (LD_{50}) levels for scandium chloride for rats have been determined as 755 mg/kg for intraperitoneal and 4 g/kg for oral administration. In the light of these results, compounds of scandium should be handled as compounds of moderate toxicity. Scandium appears to be handled by the body in a manner similar to gallium, with similar hazards involving its poorly soluble hydroxide.
