= Yttrium(III) fluoride =

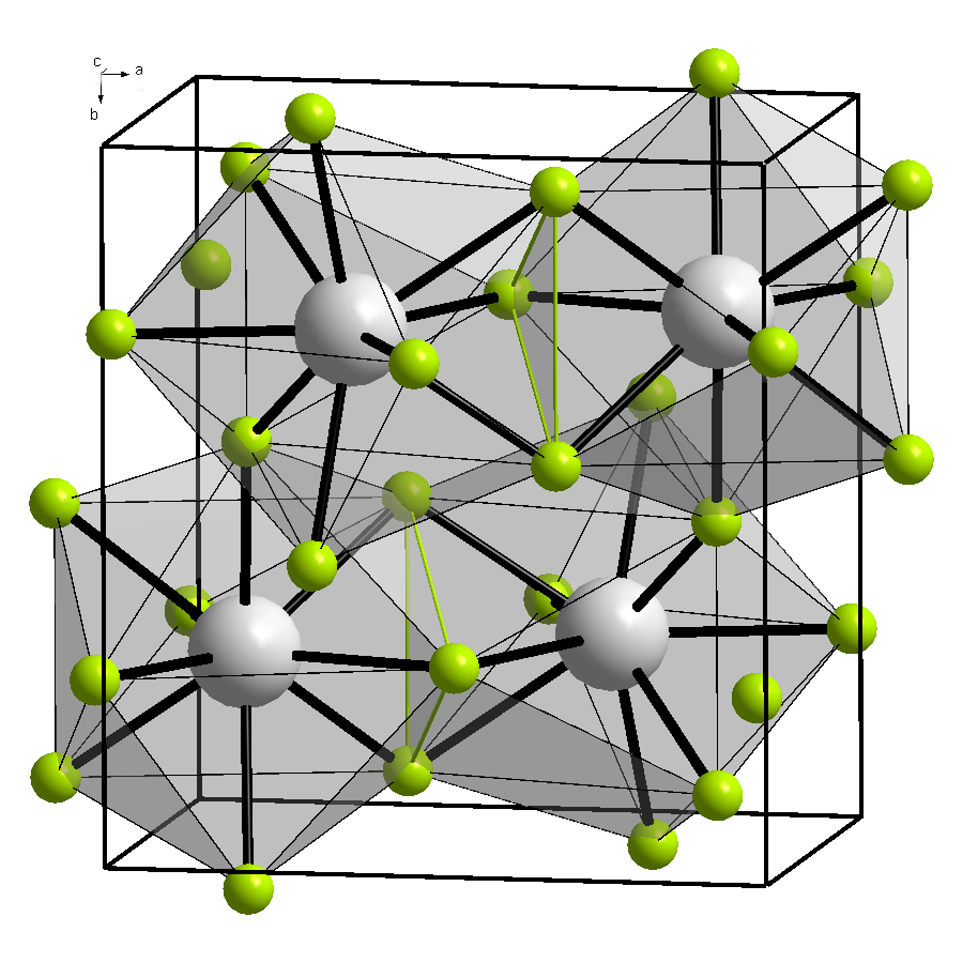
- Yttrium(III) fluoride

Names
- Other names yttrium trifluoride

Identifiers
CAS Number	13709-49-4
3D model (JSmol)	Interactive image
ChemSpider	75502
ECHA InfoCard	100.033.855
EC Number	237-257-5
PubChem CID	83679
UNII	V8QS7WES60
CompTox Dashboard (EPA)	DTXSID2065595
- InChI: InChI=1S/3FH.Y/h3*1H;/q;;;+3/p-3 Key: RBORBHYCVONNJH-UHFFFAOYSA-K; InChI=1/3FH.Y/h3*1H;/q;;;+3/p-3 Key: RBORBHYCVONNJH-DFZHHIFOAP
- SMILES: F[Y](F)F

Properties
Chemical formula	YF_{3}
Molar mass	145.90 g mol^{−1}
Appearance	white powder
Density	4.01 g cm^{−3}
Melting point	1,387 °C (2,529 °F; 1,660 K)
Boiling point	2,230 °C (4,050 °F; 2,500 K)
Solubility in water	insoluble
Solubility in acid	soluble
Refractive index (n_{D})	1.51 (500 nm)

Structure
Crystal structure	Orthorhombic, oP16, SpaceGroup = Pnma, No. 62

Hazards
- GHS labelling
Pictograms	(GHS07: Exclamation mark)
Signal word	Warning
Hazard statements	H302, H312, H315, H319, H332, H335
Precautionary statements	P261, P264, P270, P271, P280, P301+P312, P302+P352, P304+P312, P304+P340, P305+P351+P338, P312, P321, P322, P330, P332+P313, P337+P313, P362, P363, P403+P233, P405, P501
Flash point	Non-flammable

Related compounds
Other anions	Yttrium(III) chloride Yttrium(III) bromide Yttrium(III) iodide
Other cations	Scandium(III) fluoride Lutetium(III) fluoride
- Except where otherwise noted, data are given for materials in their standard state (at 25 °C [77 °F], 100 kPa). verify (what is ?) Infobox references

Yttrium(III) fluoride is an inorganic chemical compound with the chemical formula YF_{3}. It is not known naturally in "pure" form. The fluoride minerals containing essential yttrium include tveitite-(Y) (Y,Na)_{6}Ca_{6}Ca_{6}F_{42} and gagarinite-(Y) NaCaY(F,Cl)_{6}. Sometimes mineral fluorite contains admixtures of yttrium.

== Synthesis ==
YF_{3} can be produced by reacting fluorine with yttria or yttrium hydroxide with hydrofluoric acid.

Y(OH)_{3} + 3HF → YF_{3} + 3H_{2}O

== Properties ==
Yttrium(III) fluoride has a refractive index of 1.51 at 500 nm and is transparent in the range from 193 nm to 14,000 nm (i.e. from the UV to IR range).

Pure yttrium can be obtained from yttrium(III) fluoride by reduction with calcium.

Yttrium(III) fluoride crystallizes in the orthorhombic crystal system, with space group Pnma (space group no. 62), with the lattice parameters a = 6.3537 Å, b = 6.8545 Å, c = 4.3953 Å. Yttrium is nine times coordinated by fluorine atoms.

== Occurrence and uses ==
It occurs as the mineral waimirite-(Y).

Yttrium(III) fluoride can be used for the production of metallic yttrium, thin films, glasses and ceramics.

== Hazards ==
Conditions/substances to avoid are: acids, active metals and moisture.
