= Yttrium(III) bromide =

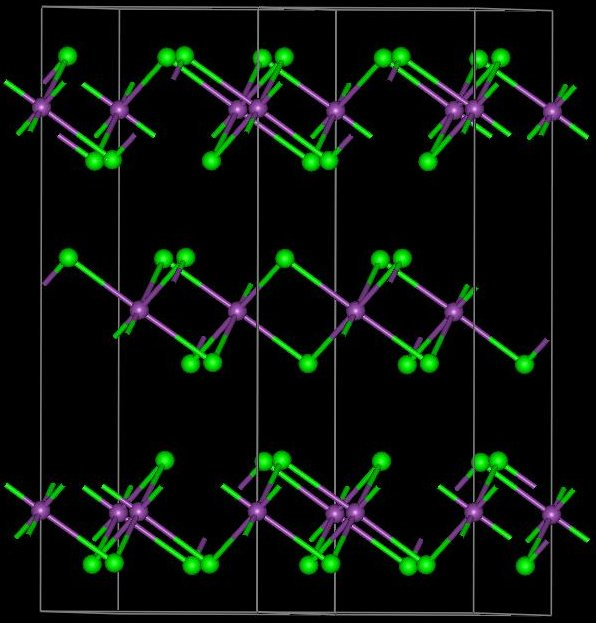

Names
- IUPAC name Yttrium(III) bromide
- Other names Yttrium tribromide

Identifiers
CAS Number	13469-98-2
3D model (JSmol)	Interactive image
ChemSpider	75340
ECHA InfoCard	100.033.375
EC Number	236-728-2
PubChem CID	83505
UNII	D60QT594ZJ
CompTox Dashboard (EPA)	DTXSID4065494
- InChI: InChI=1S/3BrH.Y/h3*1H;/q;;;+3/p-3 Key: FSDCGXUNLWDJNL-UHFFFAOYSA-K; InChI=1/3BrH.Y/h3*1H;/q;;;+3/p-3 Key: FSDCGXUNLWDJNL-DFZHHIFOAK
- SMILES: Br[Y](Br)Br

Properties
Chemical formula	YBr_{3}
Molar mass	328.618 g/mol
Appearance	colorless hygroscopic crystals
Melting point	904 °C (1,659 °F; 1,177 K)
Solubility in water	83.3 g/100 mL at 30°C

Structure
Crystal structure	Trigonal, hR24
Space group	R-3, No. 148

Hazards
- GHS labelling
Pictograms	(GHS07: Exclamation mark)
Signal word	Warning
Hazard statements	H315, H319, H335
Precautionary statements	P261, P264, P271, P280, P302+P352, P304+P340, P305+P351+P338, P312, P321, P332+P313, P337+P313, P362, P403+P233, P405, P501
NFPA 704 (fire diamond)	1 0 0

Related compounds
Other anions	Yttrium(III) fluoride Yttrium(III) chloride Yttrium(III) iodide
Other cations	Scandium bromide Lutetium(III) bromide
- Except where otherwise noted, data are given for materials in their standard state (at 25 °C [77 °F], 100 kPa). verify (what is ?) Infobox references

Yttrium(III) bromide is an inorganic compound with the chemical formula YBr_{3}. It is a white solid. Anhydrous yttrium(III) bromide can be produced by reacting yttrium oxide or yttrium(III) bromide hydrate and ammonium bromide. The reaction proceeds via the intermediate (NH_{4})_{3}YBr_{6}. Another method is to react yttrium carbide (YC_{2}) and elemental bromine. Yttrium(III) bromide can be reduced by yttrium metal to YBr or Y_{2}Br_{3}. It can react with osmium to produce Y_{4}Br_{4}Os.
