= Lutetium(III) fluoride =

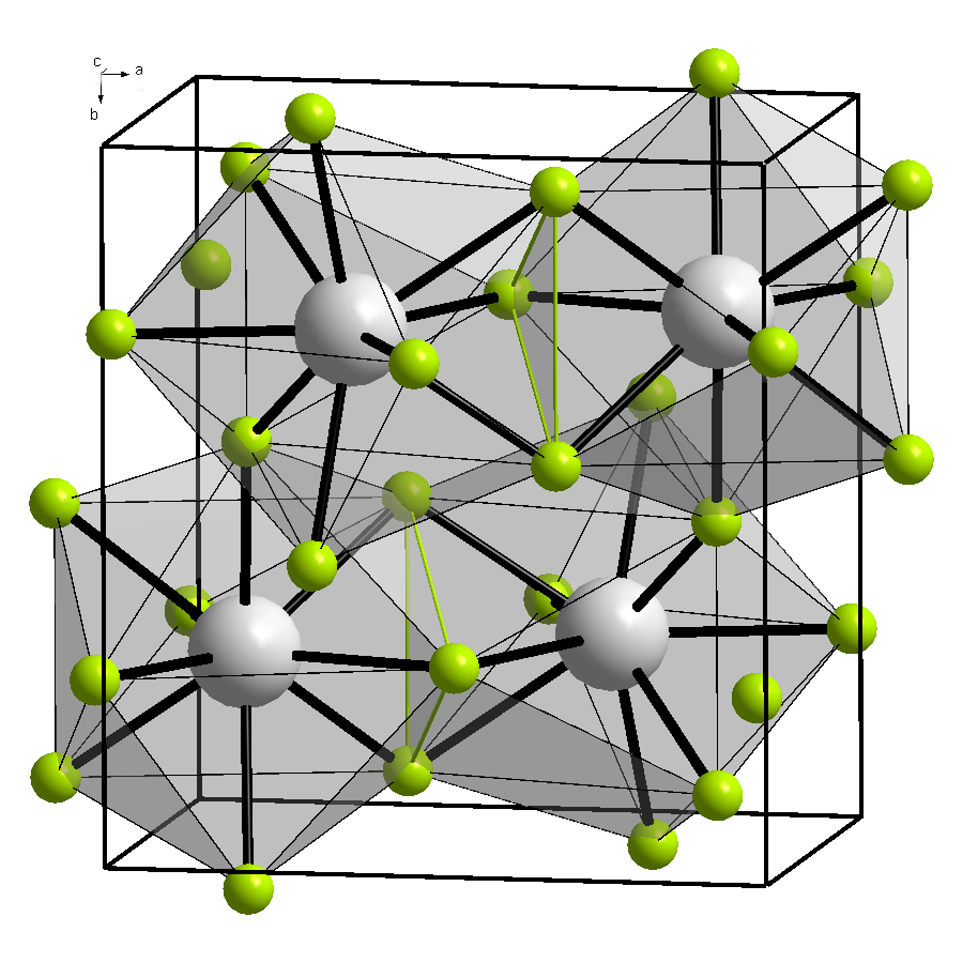

Names
- Other names lutetium trifluoride

Identifiers
CAS Number	13760-81-1
3D model (JSmol)	Interactive image
ChemSpider	75534
ECHA InfoCard	100.033.945
EC Number	237-355-8
PubChem CID	83712
UNII	I36LOL46B6
CompTox Dashboard (EPA)	DTXSID8065614
- InChI: InChI=1S/3FH.Lu/h3*1H;/q;;;+3/p-3 Key: VIHLFTMKXFWYAS-UHFFFAOYSA-K
- SMILES: F[Lu](F)F

Properties
Chemical formula	LuF_{3}
Molar mass	231.97g/mol
Appearance	white powder
Density	8.29 g/cm^{3}
Melting point	1,184 °C (2,163 °F; 1,457 K)
Boiling point	2200°C
Solubility in water	n/a

Hazards
- GHS labelling
Pictograms	(GHS06: Toxic)
Signal word	Danger
Hazard statements	H301, H311, H315, H319, H331, H335
Precautionary statements	P261, P264, P270, P271, P280, P301+P310, P302+P352, P304+P340, P305+P351+P338, P311, P312, P321, P322, P330, P332+P313, P337+P313, P361, P362, P363, P403+P233, P405, P501

Related compounds
Other anions	Lutetium(III) chloride Lutetium(III) bromide
Other cations	Scandium(III) fluoride Yttrium(III) fluoride
- Except where otherwise noted, data are given for materials in their standard state (at 25 °C [77 °F], 100 kPa). Infobox references

Lutetium(III) fluoride is an inorganic compound with a chemical formula LuF_{3}.

== Production ==
Lutetium(III) fluoride can be produced by reacting lutetium oxide with hydrogen fluoride, or reacting lutetium chloride and hydrofluoric acid:

Lu_{2}O_{3} + 6 HF → 2 LuF_{3} + 3 H_{2}O
LuCl_{3} + 3 HF → LuF_{3} + 3 HCl

It can also be produced by reacting lutetium sulfide and hydrofluoric acid:

3 Lu_{2}S_{3}+ 20 HF + (2 + 2x) H_{2}O → 2 (H_{3}O)Lu_{3}F_{10}·xH_{2}O↓ + 9 H_{2}S↑ (x = 0.9)
(H_{3}O)Lu_{3}F_{10} → 3 LuF_{3} + HF↑ + H_{2}O↑

Lutetium oxide and nitrogen trifluoride react at 240 °C to produce LuOF. A second step happens below 460 °C to produce LuF_{3}.
