= Metal-halide lamp =

Type of lamp

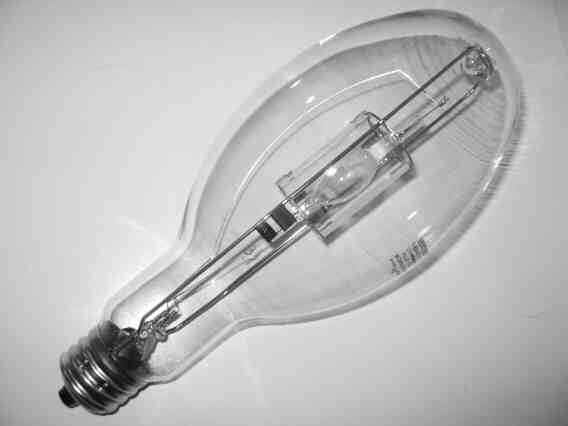
Metal halide lamp with arc tube shield, for open fixtures

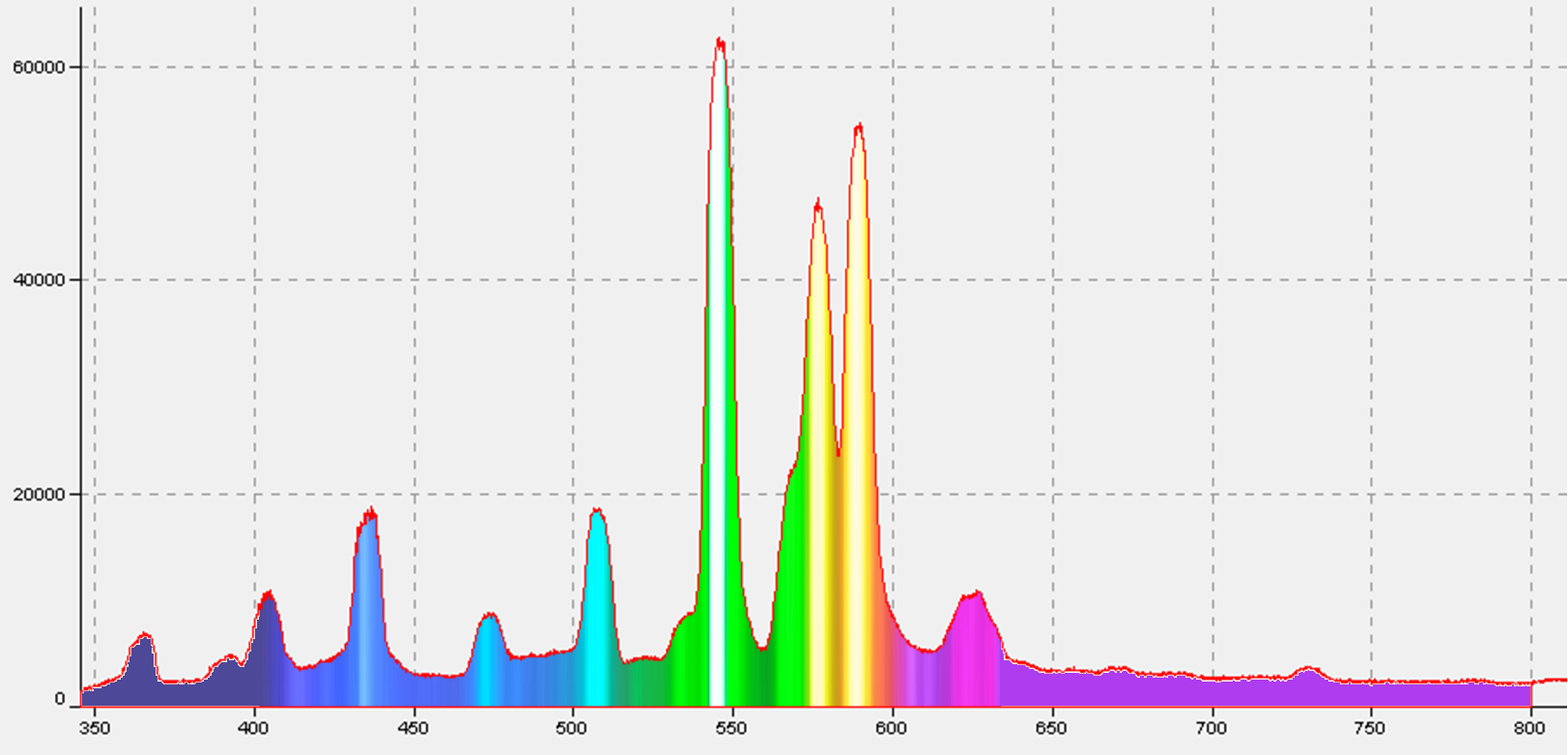
A common spectrum of American metal halide lamps, which contains sodium iodide and scandium iodide.

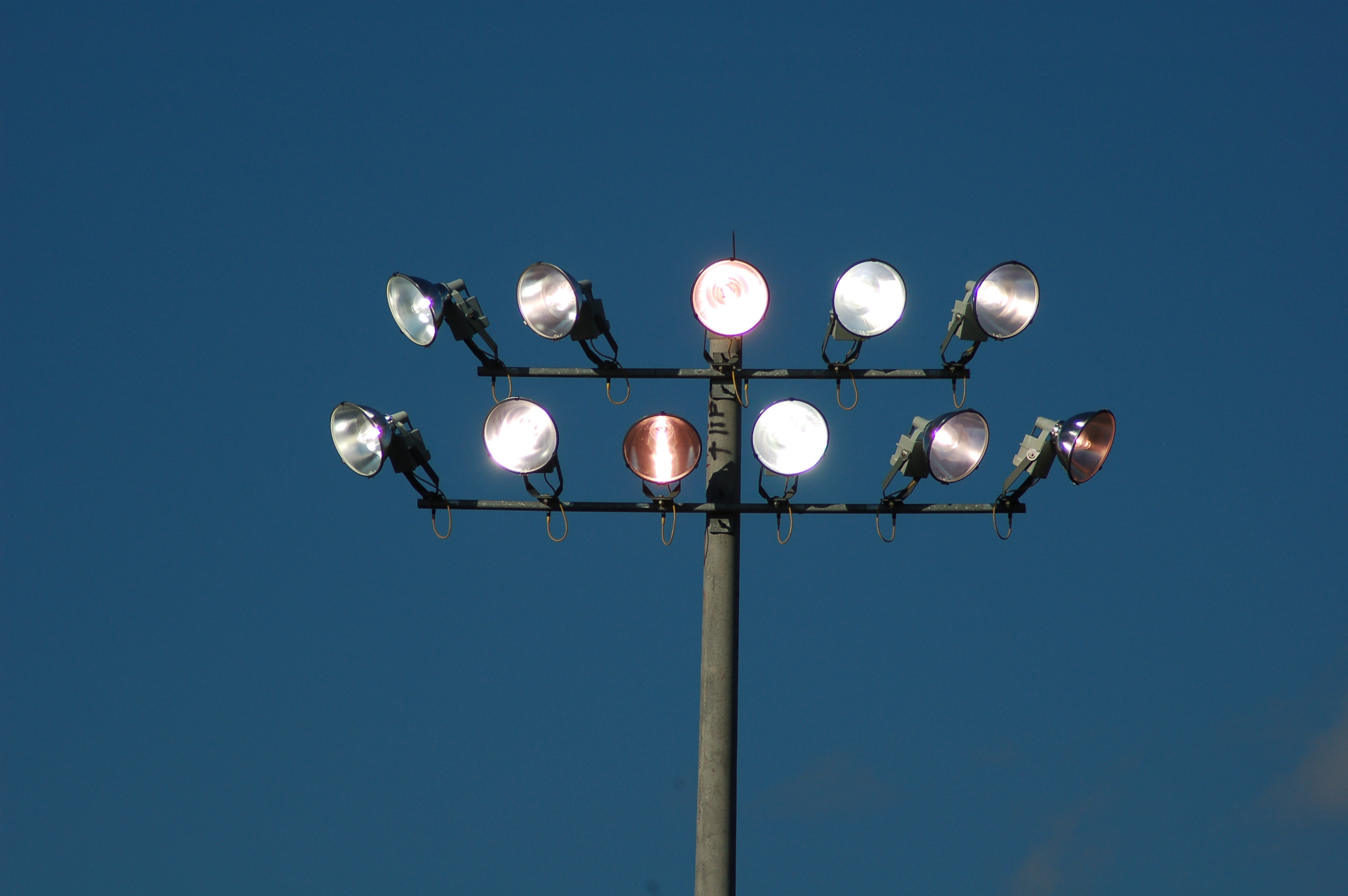
Metal halide floodlights at a baseball field

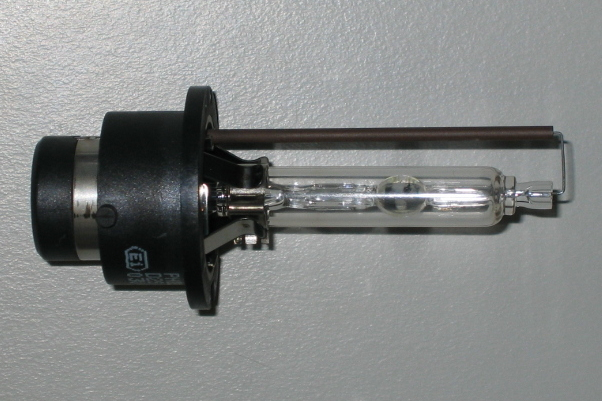
Metal halide lamp for automotive headlights

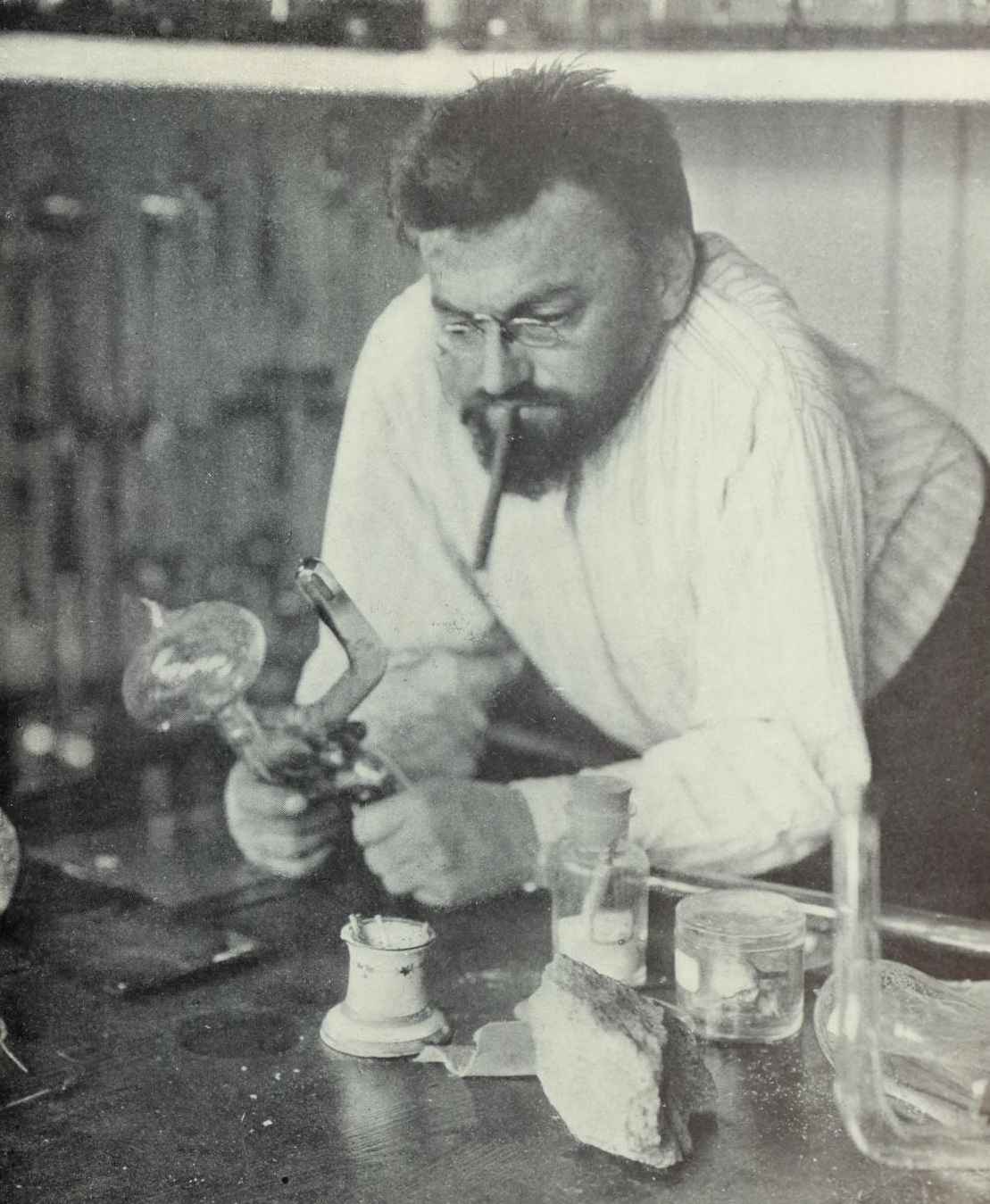
Metal halide lamps were invented by Charles Proteus Steinmetz in 1912 and are now used in almost every city in the world.

A metal-halide lamp is an electrical lamp that produces light by an electric arc through a gaseous mixture of vaporized mercury and metal halides (compounds of metals with bromine or iodine). It is a type of high-intensity discharge (HID) gas discharge lamp. Developed in the 1960s, they are similar to mercury vapor lamps, but contain additional metal halide compounds in the quartz arc tube, which improve the efficiency and color rendition of the light. The most common metal halide compound used is sodium iodide. Once the arc tube reaches its running temperature, the sodium dissociates from the iodine, adding orange and reds to the lamp's spectrum from the sodium D line as the metal ionizes. As a result, metal-halide lamps have high luminous efficacy of around 75–100 lumens per watt, which is about twice that of mercury vapor lights and 3 to 5 times that of incandescent lights and produce an intense white light. Lamp life is 6,000 to 15,000 hours. As one of the most efficient sources of high CRI white light, metal halides as of 2005 were the fastest growing segment of the lighting industry. They are used for wide area overhead lighting of commercial, industrial, and public places, such as parking lots, sports arenas, factories, and retail stores, as well as residential security lighting, automotive headlamps (Often generically known as "xenon headlights") and indoor cannabis grow operations.

The lamps consist of a small fused quartz or ceramic arc tube which contains the gases and the arc, enclosed inside a larger glass bulb (Or quartz bulb with a coating to filter out the ultraviolet light produced in the case of compact lamps). They operate at a pressure between 4 and 20 atmospheres, and require special fixtures to operate safely, as well as an electrical ballast. Metal atoms produce most of the light output. They require a warm-up period of several minutes to reach full light output.

== Uses ==
Metal-halide lamps are used for general lighting purposes both indoors and outdoors, such as commercial, industrial, and public spaces, parking lots, sports arenas, factories, and retail stores, as well as residential security lighting; automotive and specialty applications are further fields of usage.

Metal-halide lamps are used in automobile headlights, where they are commonly generically called "xenon headlamps" due to the use of xenon gas in the bulb, to provide minimal light upon turning on before the lamp warms up, instead of the argon typically used in other halide lamps.

Another widespread use for such lamps is in photographic lighting and stage lighting fixtures, where they are commonly generically known as MSD or HMI lamps and are generally used in 150, 250, 400, 575 and 1,200 watt ratings, especially intelligent lighting.

Because of their wide spectrum and good efficiency they were used for indoor growing applications, specifically cannabis, and were quite popular with reef aquarists who needed a high intensity light source for their corals. However LEDs have almost entirely replaced metal halide in both applications, with just a handful of purists still holding on.

== Operation ==
Like other gas-discharge lamps such as the very-similar mercury-vapor lamps, metal-halide lamps produce light by ionizing a mixture of gases in an electric arc. In a metal-halide lamp, the compact arc tube contains a mixture of argon, neon or xenon, mercury, and a variety of metal halides, such as sodium iodide and scandium iodide. The particular mixture of metal halides influences the correlated color temperature and intensity (making the light more blue or red, for example). When started, the argon gas in the lamp is ionized first, which helps to maintain the arc across the two electrodes with the applied starting voltage. The heat generated by the arc and electrodes then ionizes the mercury and metal halides into a plasma, which produces an increasingly brighter white light as the temperature and pressure increases to operating conditions.

The arc-tube operates at anywhere from 5–50 atm or more (70–700 psi or 500–5000 kPa) and 1000–3000 °C. Like all other gas-discharge lamps, metal-halide lamps have negative resistance (with the rare exception of self-ballasted lamps), and so require a ballast to provide proper starting and operating voltages while regulating the current flow through the lamp. About 24% of the energy used by metal-halide lamps produces light (an efficacy of 65–115 lm/W), making them substantially more efficient than incandescent bulbs, which typically have efficiencies in the range 2–4%.

== Components ==
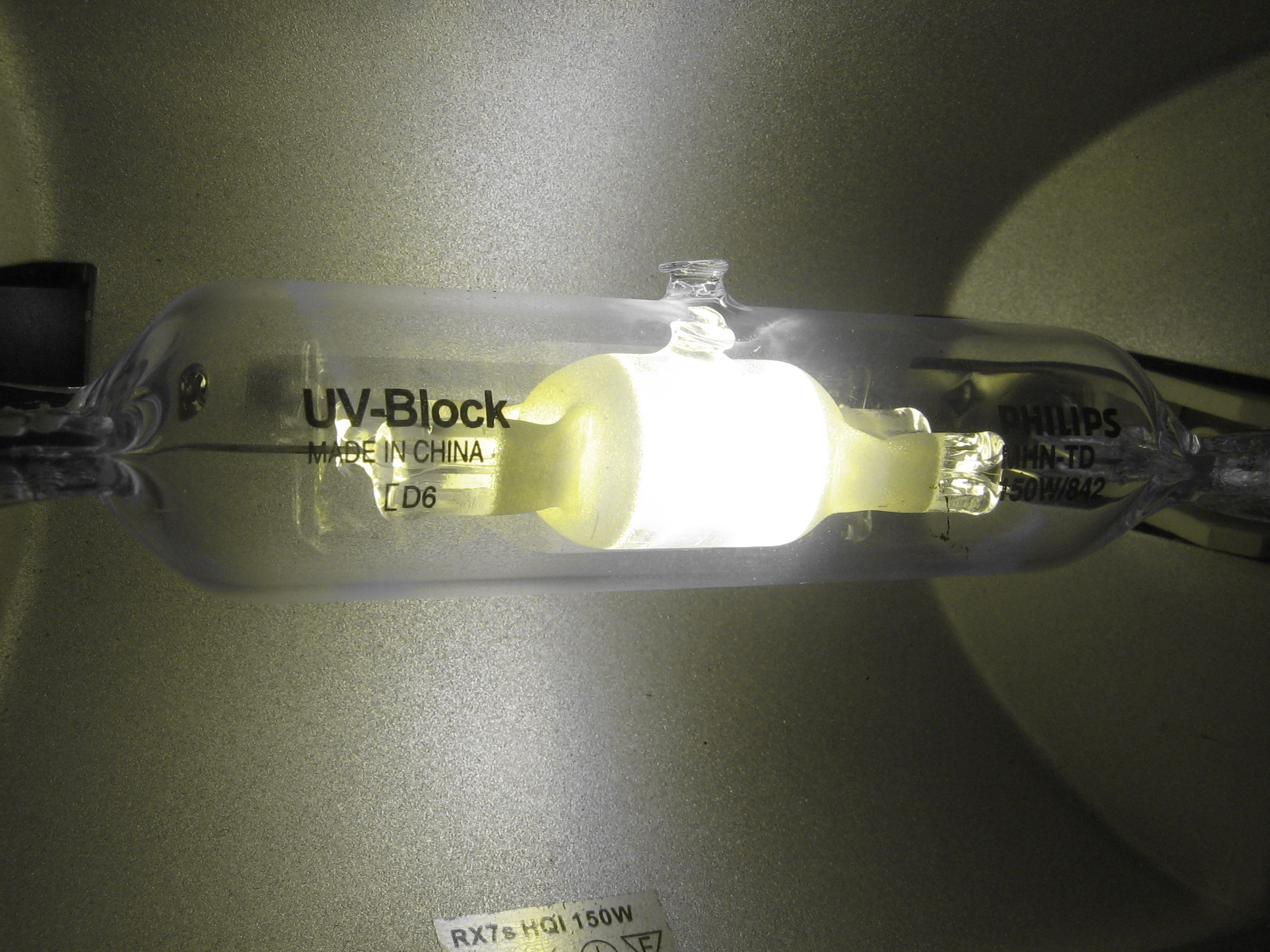
150 watt metal-halide bulb in fixture, about halfway through warmup

Metal-halide lamps consist of an arc tube with electrodes, an outer bulb, and a base.

=== Arc tube ===
Inside the fused quartz arc tube, two tungsten electrodes doped with thorium are sealed into each end and an AC voltage is applied to them through molybdenum foil seals fused in silica. It is the arc between the two electrodes where the light is actually created.

Besides mercury vapor, the lamp contains iodides, bromides or chlorides of different metals. Iodine, bromine and chlorine are of the halogen group of the periodic table, and so are termed "halides" when ionized. Scandium and sodium are also used in some types, with thallium, indium, and sodium in European Tri-Salt models. Dysprosium used for high color temperature and tin for lower color temperature. Holmium and thulium are used in very high power movie lighting models and in daylight colored metal halide lamps for area floodlighting, compact low wattage metal halide lamps, as well as stadium lighting in Europe. Gallium or lead are used in special high UV-A models for printing purposes. The mixture of the metals used defines the color of the lamp. Some types, for festive or theatrical effect, use almost pure iodides of thallium, for green lamps, and indium, for blue lamps. An alkali metal, (sodium or potassium), is almost always added to reduce the arc impedance, allowing the arc tube to be made sufficiently long and simple electrical ballasts to be used. A noble gas, usually argon, is cold filled into the arc tube at a pressure of about 2 kPa to facilitate starting of the discharge. Argon filled lamps are typically quite slow to start up, taking several minutes to reach full light intensity; xenon fill, as used in automotive headlamps, start up relatively faster.

The ends of the arc tube are often externally coated with white infrared–reflective zirconium silicate or zirconium oxide to reflect heat back onto the electrodes to keep them hot and thermionically emitting. Some bulbs have a phosphor coating on the inner side of the outer bulb to improve the spectrum and diffuse the light.

In the mid-1980s a new type of metal-halide lamp was developed, which, instead of a quartz (fused silica) arc tube as used in mercury vapor lamps and previous metal-halide lamp designs, use a sintered alumina arc tube similar to those used in the high pressure sodium lamp. This development reduces the effects of ion creep that plagues fused silica arc tubes. During their life, sodium and other elements tend to migrate into the quartz tube and because of high UV radiation and gas ionization, will result in erosion of the electrodes therefore causing cycling of the lamp. The sintered alumina arc tube does not allow the ions to creep through, maintaining a more constant color over the life of the lamp. These are usually referred as ceramic metal-halide lamps or CMH lamps.

The concept of adding metallic iodides for spectral modification (specifically: sodium - yellow, lithium - red, indium - blue, potassium and rubidium - deep red, and thallium - green) of a mercury arc discharge to create the first metal-halide lamp can be traced to patent US1025932 in 1912 by Charles Proteus Steinmetz, the "Wizard of General Electric".

The amount of mercury used has lessened over years of progress.

=== Outer bulb ===
Most types are fitted with an outer glass bulb to protect the inner components and prevent heat loss. The outer bulb can also be used to block some or all of the UV light generated by the mercury vapor discharge, and can be composed of specially doped "UV stop" fused silica. Ultraviolet protection is commonly employed in single ended (single base) models and double ended models that provide illumination for nearby human use. Some high-powered models, particularly the lead-gallium UV printing models and models used for some types of sports stadium lighting do not have an outer bulb. The use of a bare arc tube can allow transmission of UV or precise positioning within the optical system of a luminaire. The cover glass of the luminaire can be used to block the UV, and can also protect people or equipment if the lamp should fail by exploding.

=== Base ===
Some types have an Edison screw metal base, for various power ratings between 10 and 18,000 watts. Other types are double-ended, as depicted above, with R7s-24 bases composed of ceramic, along with metal connections between the interior of the arc tube and the exterior. These are made of various alloys (such as iron-cobalt-nickel) that have a thermal coefficient of expansion that matches that of the arc tube.

=== Ballasts ===
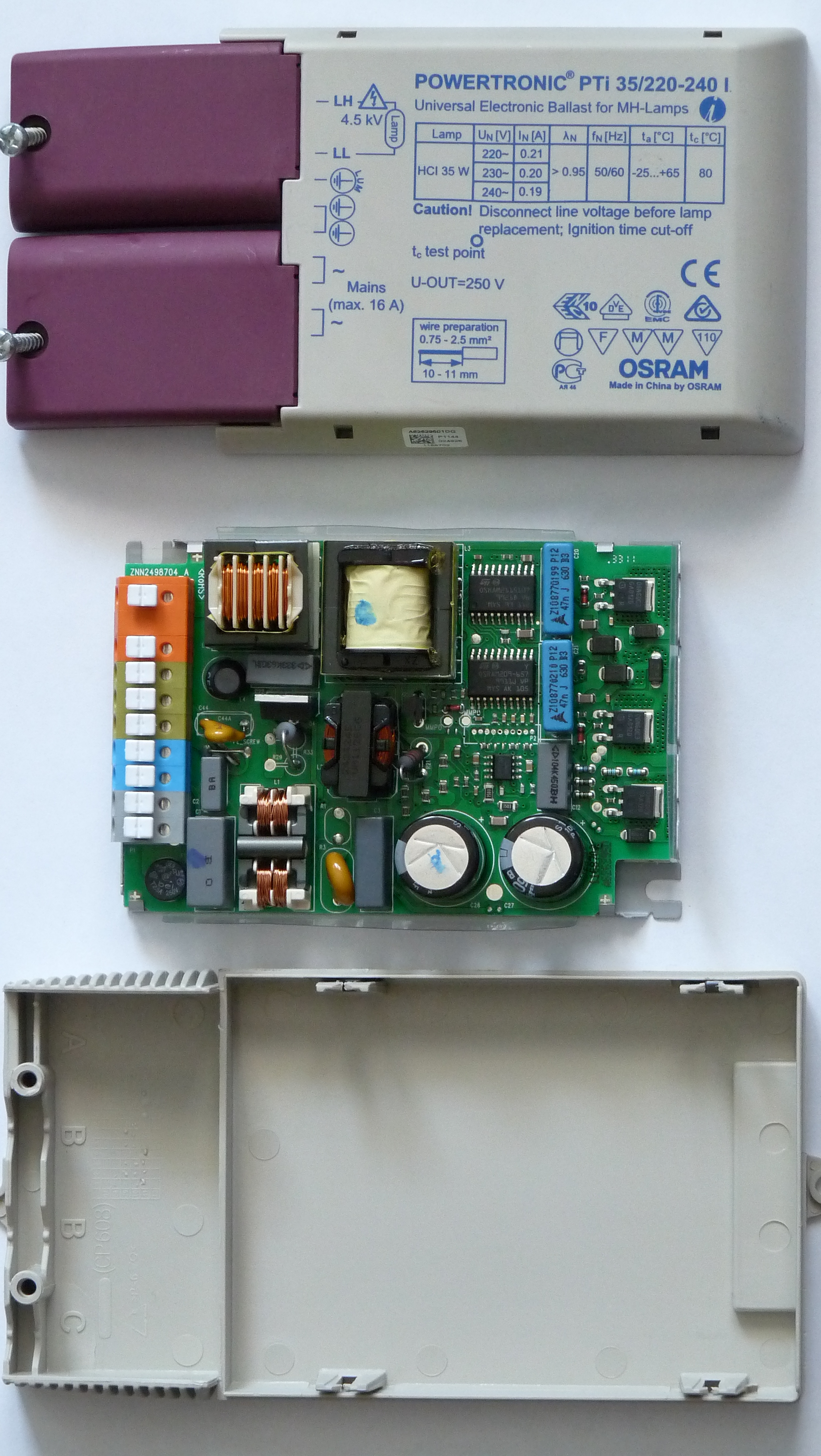
Electronic ballast for 35 W metal halide light bulbs

The electric arc in metal-halide lamps, as in all gas discharge lamps has a negative resistance property; meaning that as the current through the bulb increases, the voltage across it decreases. If the bulb is powered from a constant voltage source such as directly from the AC wiring, the current will increase until the bulb destroys itself; therefore, halide bulbs require electrical ballasts to limit the arc's current. There are two types:

1. Inductive ballast - Many fixtures use an inductive ballast, also known as a magnetic ballast, similar to those used with fluorescent lamps. This consists of an iron-core inductor. The inductor presents an impedance to AC current. If the current through the lamp increases, the inductor reduces the voltage to keep the current limited.
2. Electronic ballast - These are lighter and more compact. They consist of an electronic oscillator which generates high frequency which is then converted to a low frequency square wave current to drive the lamp. Because they have lower resistive losses than an inductive ballast, they are more energy efficient. However, high-frequency operation does not increase lamp efficiency as for fluorescent lamps. It may cause acoustic resonance in the arc, shortening the lamp life.

Pulse-start metal-halide bulbs don't contain a starting electrode which strikes the arc, and require an ignitor to generate a high-voltage (1–5 kV on cold strike, over 30 kV on hot restrike) pulse to start the arc. Electronic ballasts include the igniter circuit in one package. American National Standards Institute (ANSI) lamp-ballast system standards establish parameters for all metal-halide components (with the exception of some newer products).

== Color temperature ==
Output spectrum of a typical metal-halide lamp showing peaks at 385nm, 422nm, 497nm, 540nm, 564nm, 583nm (highest), 630nm, and 674nm.

Because of the whiter and more natural light generated, metal-halide lamps were initially preferred to the bluish mercury vapor lamps. With the introduction of specialized metal-halide mixtures, metal-halide lamps are now available with a correlated color temperature from 3,000 K to over 20,000 K. Color temperature can vary slightly from lamp to lamp, and this effect is noticeable in places where many lamps are used. Because the lamp's color characteristics tend to change during its life, color is measured after the bulb has been burned for 100 hours (seasoned) according to ANSI standards. Pulse start metal halide lamps have improved color rendering and provided a more controlled kelvin variance (±100 to 200 kelvins) because of better arctube shapes compared to probe start metal halide lamps, which do not require a starting electrode to be present and allow higher pressure and temperature of the halides.

The color temperature of a metal-halide lamp can also be affected by the electrical characteristics of the electrical system powering the bulb and manufacturing variances in the bulb itself. If a metal-halide bulb is underpowered, because of the lower operating temperature, its light output will be bluish because of the evaporation of mercury alone. This phenomenon can be seen during warmup, when the arc tube has not yet reached full operating temperature and the halides have not fully vaporized. It is also very apparent with dimming ballasts. The inverse is true for an overpowered bulb, but this condition can be hazardous, leading possibly to arc-tube explosion because of overheating and overpressure.

== Starting and warm up ==
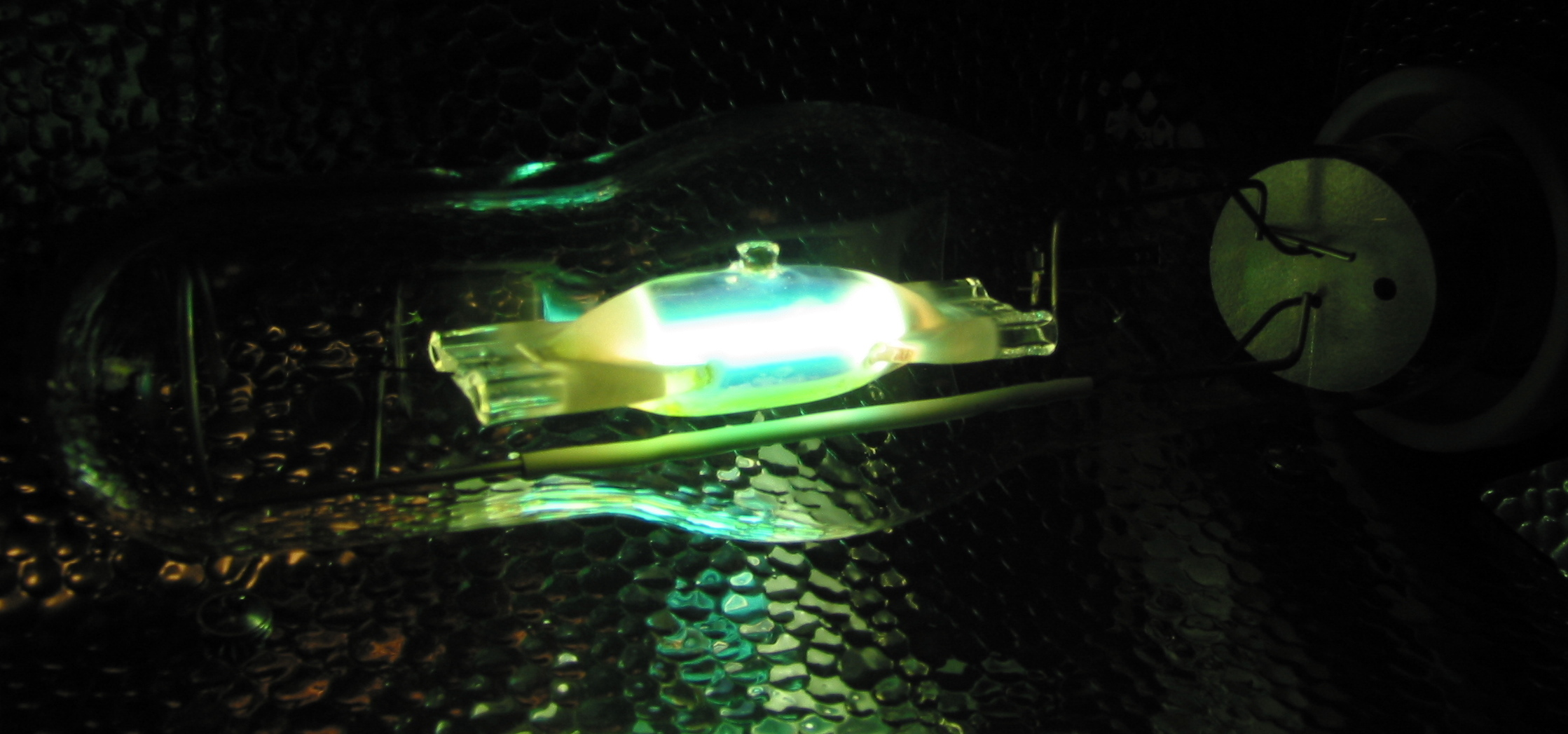
400 W metal-halide lamp shortly after powering up

A cold metal-halide lamp cannot immediately begin producing its full light capacity because the temperature and pressure in the inner arc chamber require time to reach full operating levels. Starting the initial argon arc (or xenon in automotive) sometimes takes a few seconds, and the warm up period can be as long as five minutes (depending upon lamp type). During this time the lamp exhibits different colors as the various metal halides vaporize in the arc chamber.

If power is interrupted, the lamp's arc will extinguish, and the high pressure that exists in the hot arc tube will prevent restriking the arc; with a normal ignitor a cool-down period of 5–10 minutes will be required before the lamp can be restarted, but with special ignitors and specially designed lamps, the arc can be immediately re-established. On fixtures without instant restrike capability, a momentary loss of power can mean no light for several minutes. For safety reasons, some metal-halide fixtures have a backup tungsten-halogen incandescent lamp that operates during cool-down and restrike. Once the metal halide restrikes and warms up, the incandescent safety light is switched off. A warm lamp also tends to take more time to reach its full brightness than a lamp that is started completely cold.

Most hanging ceiling lamps tend to be passively cooled, with a combined ballast and lamp fixture.

== End of life behaviour ==
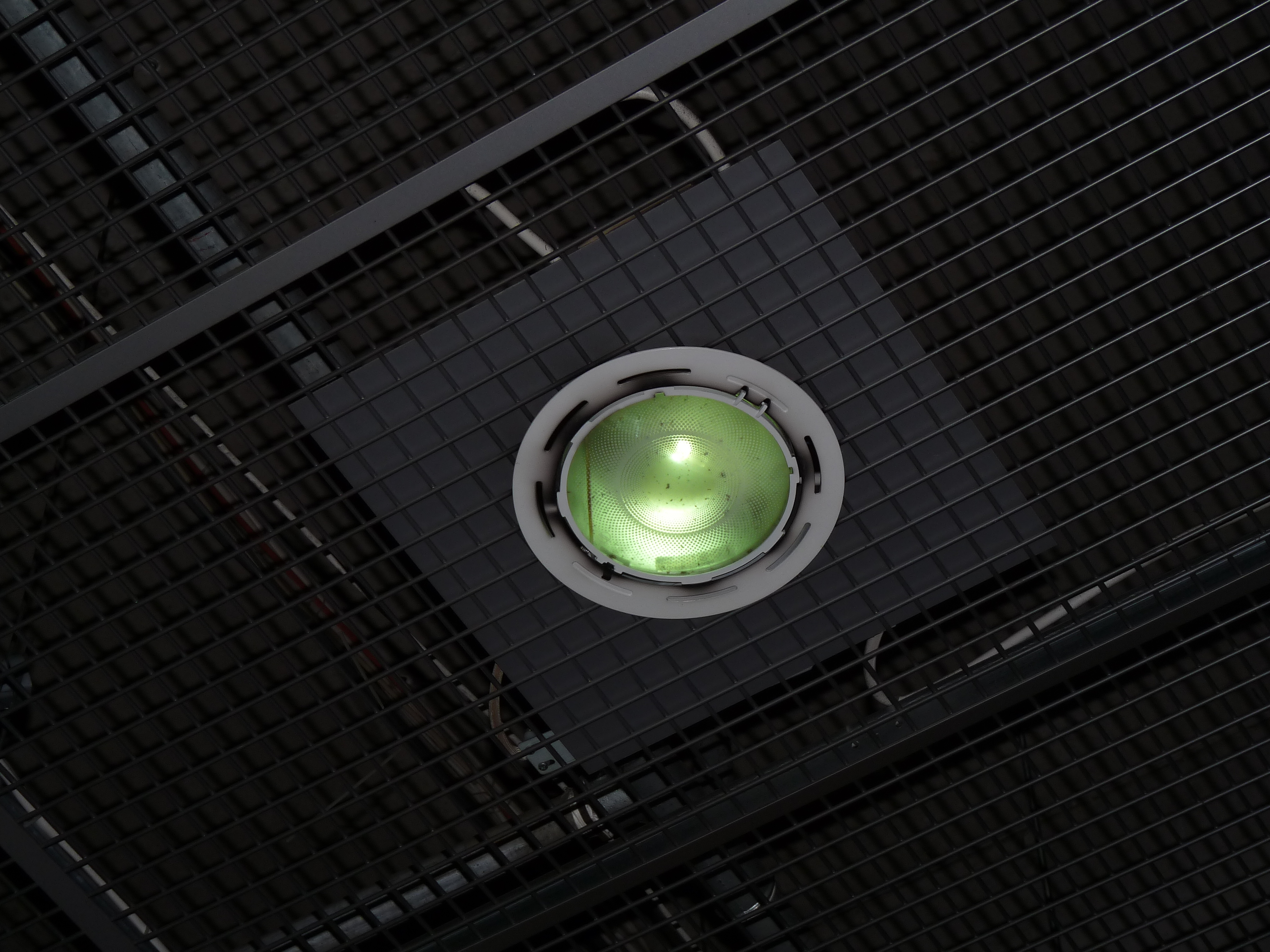
Old metal halide lamp

Metal halide lamps, usually lose their output or change color due to the loss of halides and arctube blackening. They stop working at the end of life that is similar to mercury lamps. In rare cases, they can also cycle on/off. Some can exhibit major color shift, and in rare cases, explode.

=== Risk of lamp explosion ===
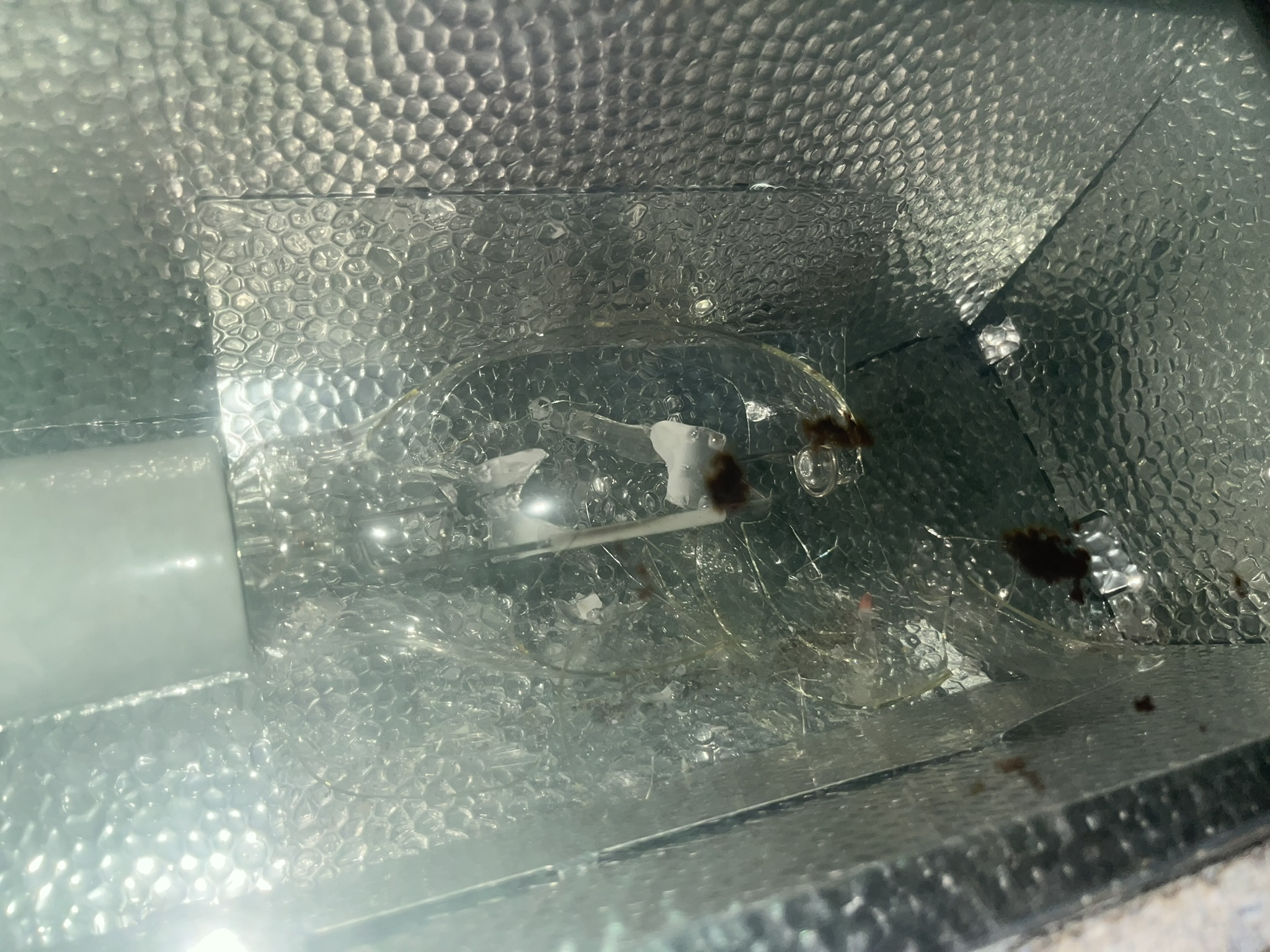
A metal halide bulb that has shattered as a result of an arc tube explosion due to uninterrupted prolonged use.

All metal halide arc tubes deteriorate in strength over their lifetime due to chemical attack, thermal stress and mechanical vibration. As the lamp ages the arc tube becomes discolored (often obtaining a dark grey shade), absorbing light and getting hotter. The tube will continue to become weaker until it eventually fails, causing the breakup of the tube.

Early failure of the arc tube may occur due to manufacturing defects. Manufacturers may "season" new lamps to check for such defects before sale.

Since a metal-halide lamp contains gases at a significant high pressure (up to 3.4 atmospheres), failure of the arc tube is inevitably a violent event. Fragments of arc tube will break the outer bulb, and hot glass fragments may fall on people or objects below. Hot fragments may present a fire hazard. Fixtures are designed to contain hot fragments with a hard glass cover, or may be designed for lamps with a quartz tube surrounding the arc tube to prevent breakage.

Shattering of the arc tube may be avoided by replacing the lamp if there is an excessive blackening of the arc tube, the arc tube begins to swell, there is a sudden changing of the light color, or the lamp begins to cycle on and off.

== Gallery ==
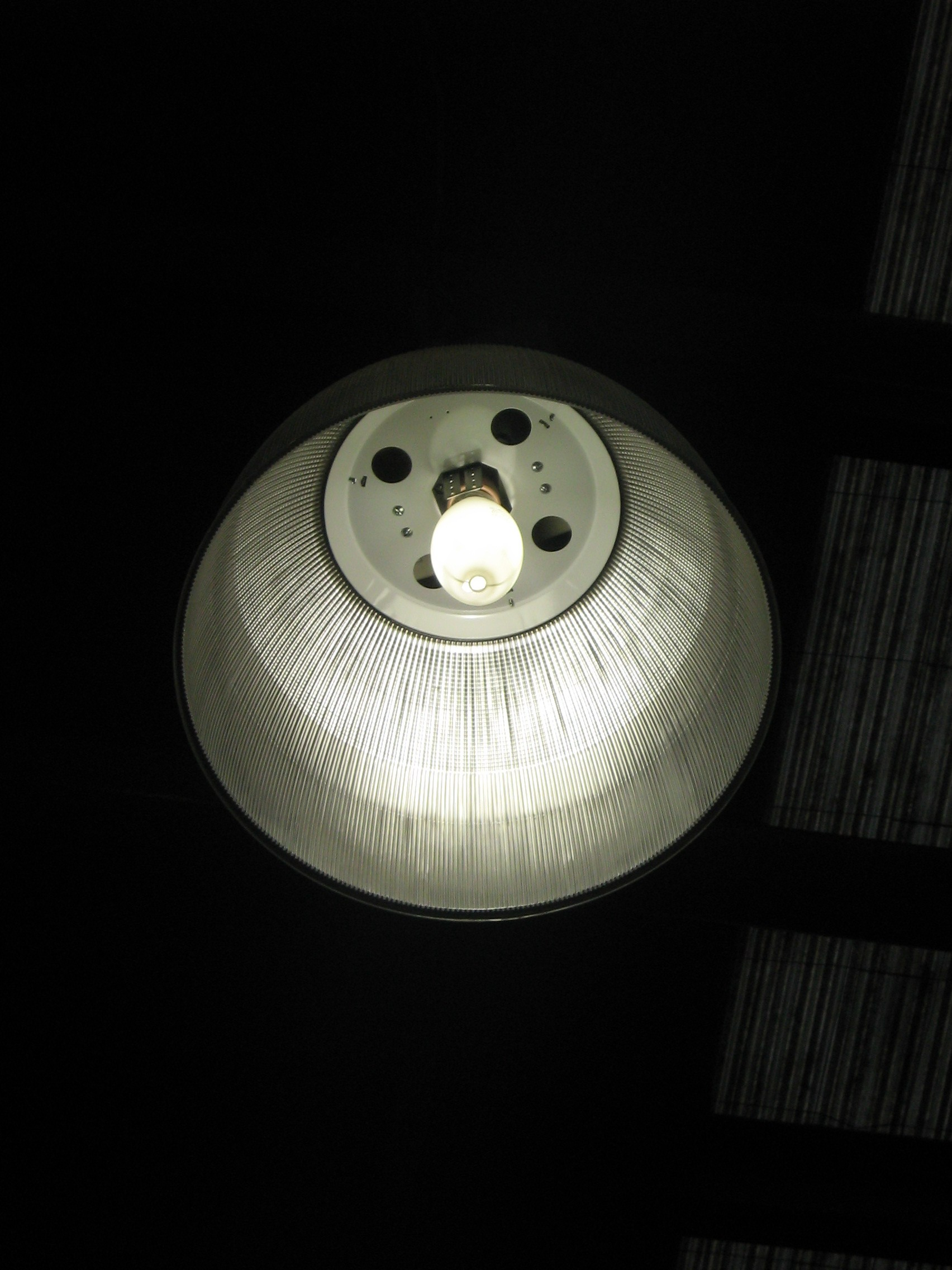
A low-bay light fixture using a high-wattage metal-halide lamp, of the type used in factories and warehouses

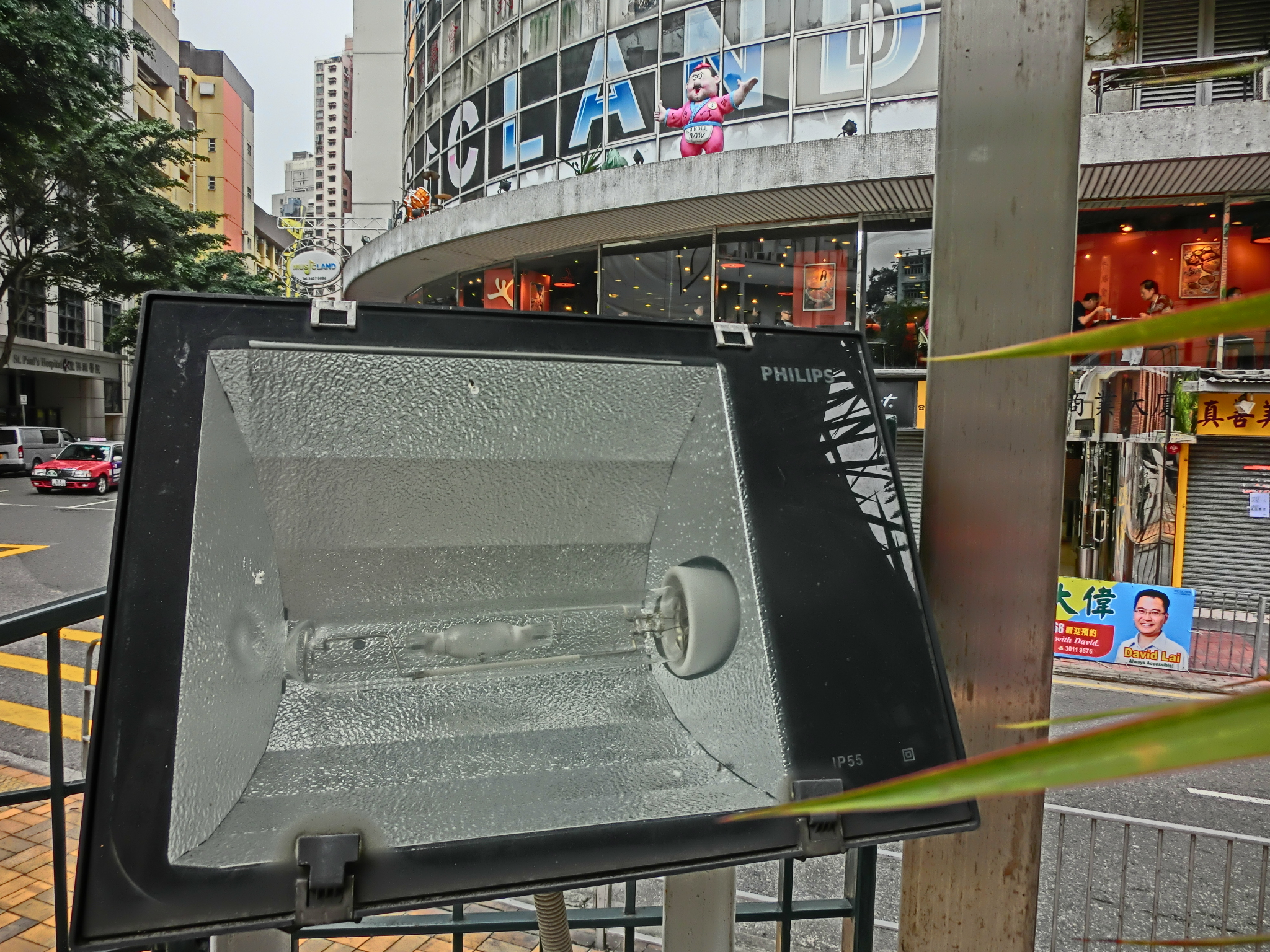
Metal halide floodlight

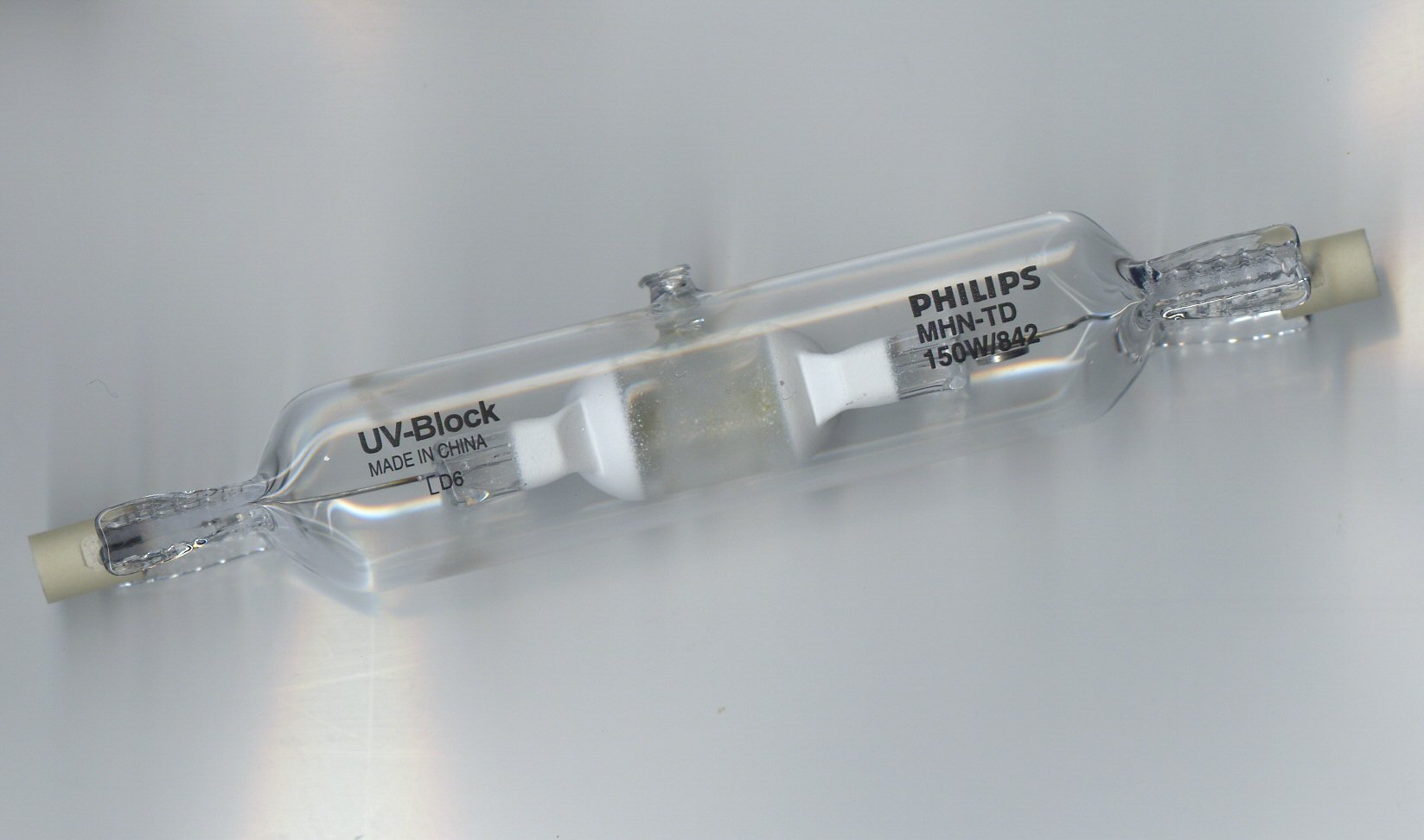
A Philips MHN-TD 150W/842 (150 watts, 4200 K) linear/tubular metal-halide lamp

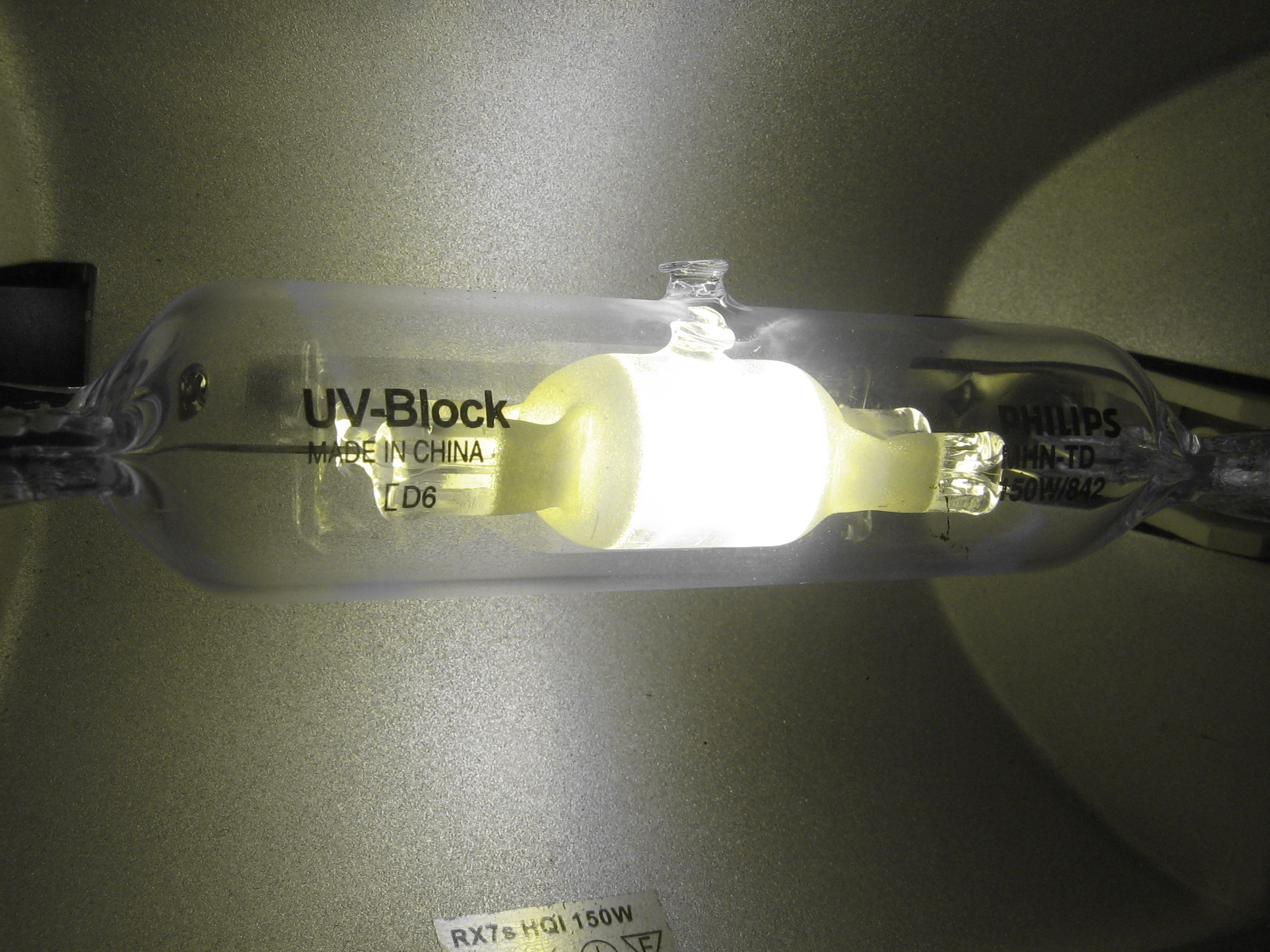
A Philips MHN-TD 150W/842 linear/tubular metal-halide lamp lit up at half power

A light source using a broad-spectrum metal-halide lamp pointing upward towards the sky

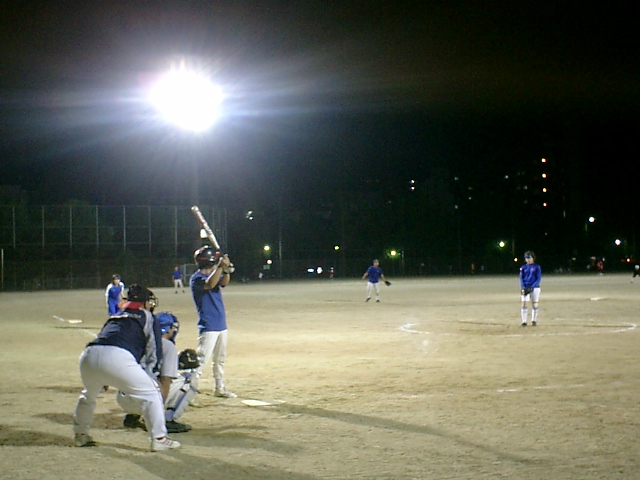
A metal-halide light bank at a softball field

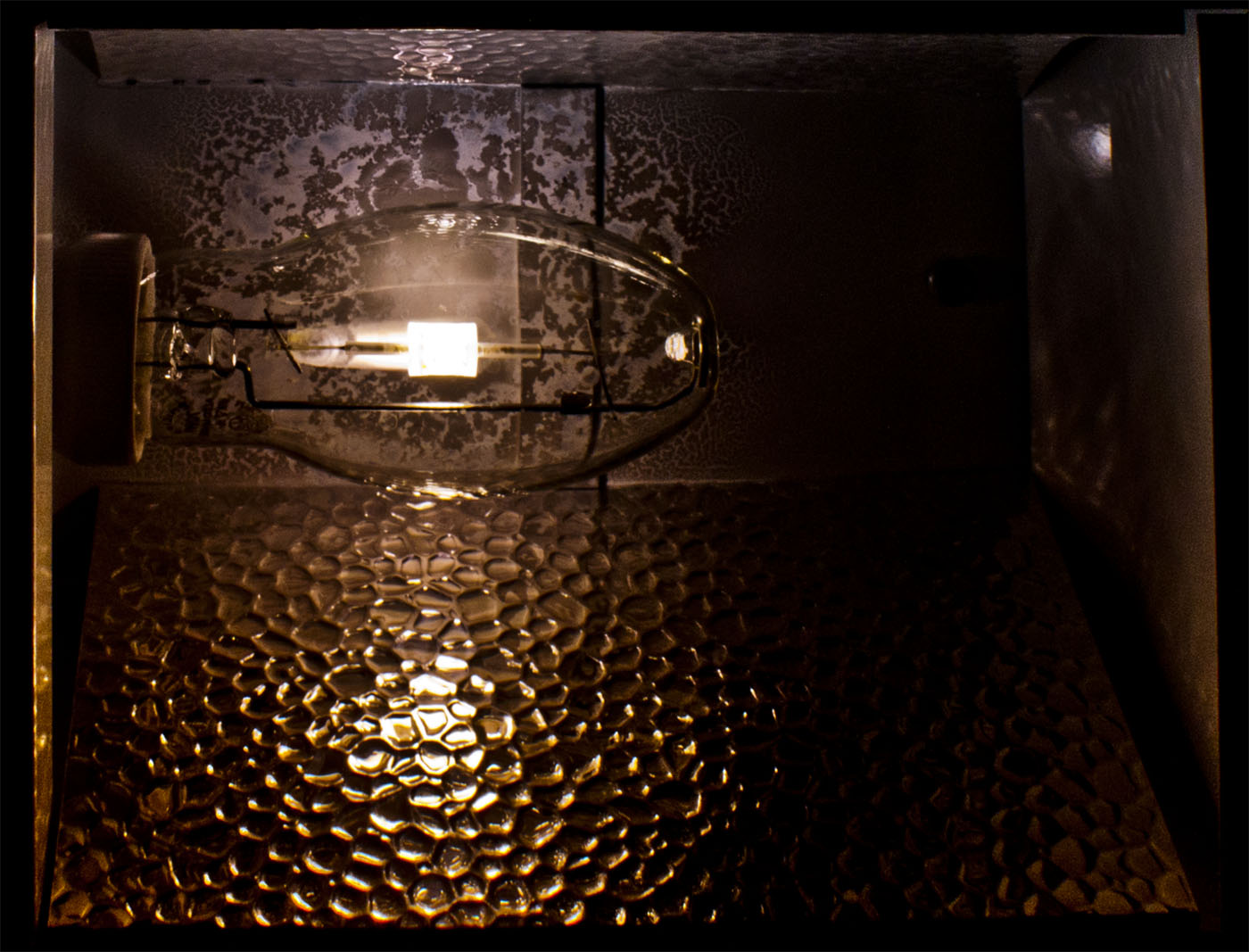
A ceramic metal-halide lamp 70 Watt - screw fixture (aquarium)

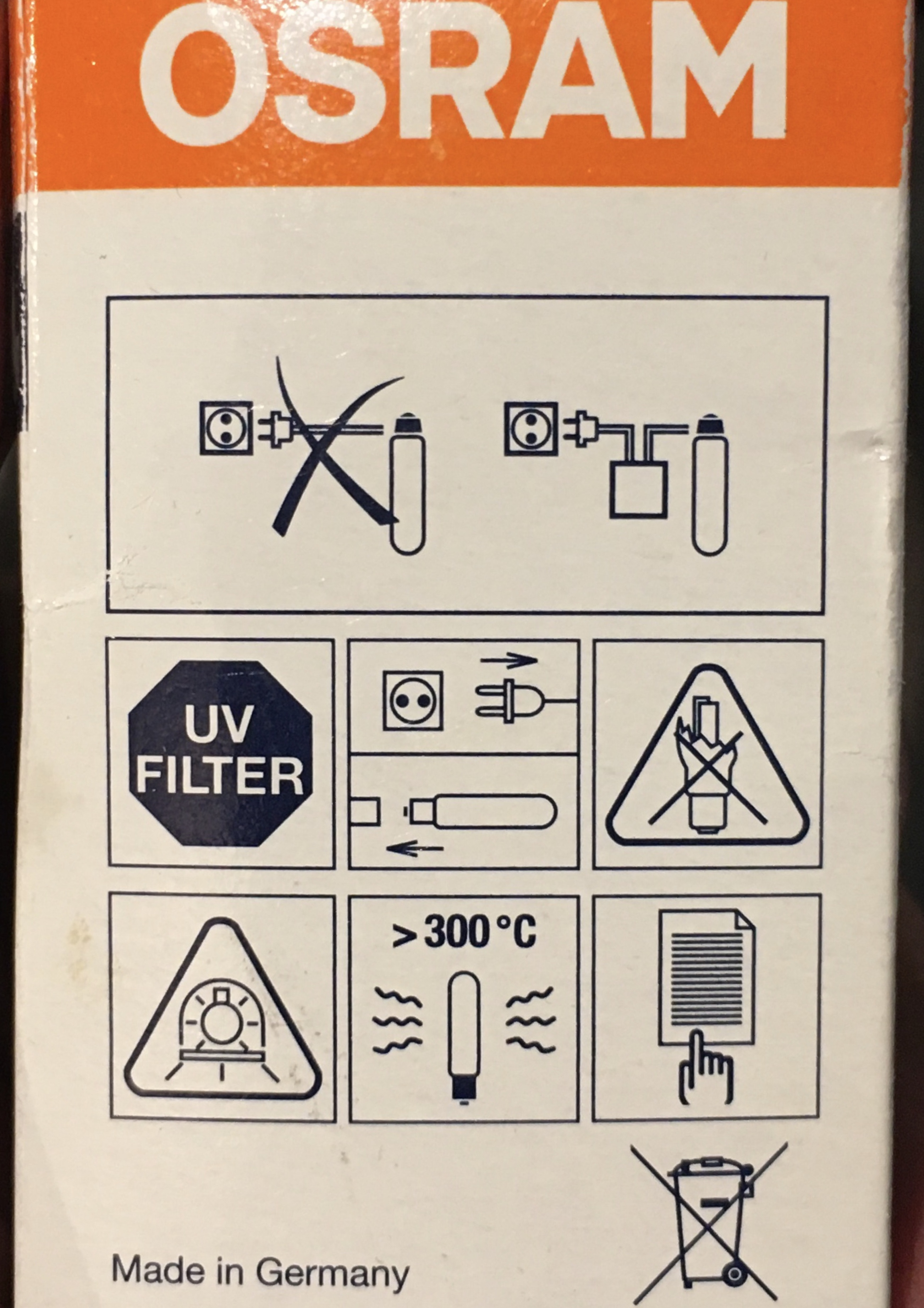
Pictograms on the packaging of a 35 W lamp. The multitude of instructions is due to the higher complexity of use in comparison to other lamp types.

== See also ==
- Arc lamp
- Hydrargyrum medium-arc iodide lamp - high power metal-halide lamps as used in cinematography
- Mercury-vapor lamp
- Sodium-vapor lamp
- Neon lamp
- Sulfur lamp
- Charles Proteus Steinmetz
