= Scandium fluoride =

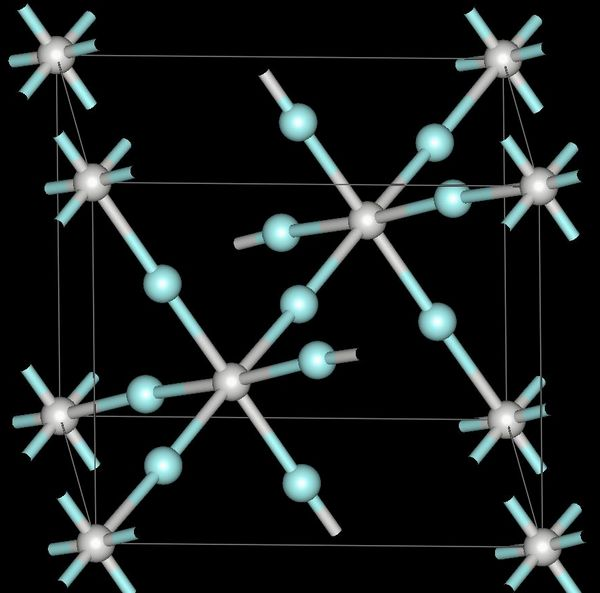

Names
- IUPAC name Scandium(III) fluoride
- Other names Scandium trifluoride

Identifiers
CAS Number	13709-47-2
3D model (JSmol)	Interactive image
ChemSpider	75501
ECHA InfoCard	100.033.854
EC Number	237-555-4
PubChem CID	83678
RTECS number	VQ8930000
CompTox Dashboard (EPA)	DTXSID7065594
- InChI: InChI=1S/3FH.Sc/h3*1H;/q;;;+3/p-3
- SMILES: [Sc+3].[F-].[F-].[F-]

Properties
Chemical formula	ScF_{3}
Molar mass	101.95112 g/mol
Appearance	bright white powder
Density	2.53 g/cm^{3}
Melting point	1,552 °C (2,826 °F; 1,825 K)
Boiling point	1,607 °C (2,925 °F; 1,880 K)
Solubility product (K_{sp})	5.81×10^{−24}

Structure
Crystal structure	Cubic, Pm3̅m
Space group	Pm3̅m, No. 221

Hazards
NFPA 704 (fire diamond)	2 0 0

Related compounds
Other anions	Scandium(III) chloride Scandium(III) bromide Scandium(III) iodide
Other cations	Yttrium(III) fluoride Lutetium(III) fluoride
Related compounds	Scandium(III) nitrate
- Except where otherwise noted, data are given for materials in their standard state (at 25 °C [77 °F], 100 kPa). verify (what is ?) Infobox references

Scandium(III) fluoride, ScF_{3}, is an ionic compound. This salt is slightly soluble in water but dissolves in the presence of excess fluoride to form the ScF_{6}^{3−} anion.

== Production ==
ScF_{3} can be produced by reacting scandium and fluorine. It is also formed during the extraction from the ore thortveitite by the reaction of Sc_{2}O_{3} with ammonium bifluoride at high temperature:

Sc_{2}O_{3} + 6 NH_{4}HF_{2} → 2 ScF_{3} + 6 NH_{4}F + 3 H_{2}O

The resulting mixture contains a number of metal fluorides and this is reduced by reaction with calcium metal at high temperature. Further purification steps are required to produce usable metallic scandium.

== Properties ==
Scandium trifluoride exhibits the unusual property of negative thermal expansion, meaning it shrinks when heated. This phenomenon is explained by the quartic oscillation of the fluoride ions. The energy stored in the bending strain of the fluoride ion is proportional to the fourth power of the displacement angle, unlike most other materials where it is proportional to the square of the displacement. A fluorine atom is bound to two scandium atoms, and as temperature increases the fluorine oscillates more perpendicularly to its bonds. This motion draws the scandium atoms together throughout the bulk material, which contracts. ScF_{3} exhibits this property from at least 10 K to 1100 K above which it shows the normal positive thermal expansion; furthermore, the material has cubic symmetry over this entire temperature range, and up to at least 1600 K at ambient pressure. The negative thermal expansion at very low temperatures is quite strong (coefficient of thermal expansion around -14 ppm/K between 60 and 110 K).

At ambient pressures scandium trifluoride adopts the cubic crystal system, using the perovskite structure with one metal position vacant. The unit cell dimension is 4.01 Å. Under pressure scandium trifluoride also forms different crystal structures with rhombohedral, and above 3 GPa tetrahedral.

Scandium fluoride features high transparency across UV to IR wavelengths, low optical absorption, and a low refractive index (~1.5). It exhibits nonlinear optical properties for frequency conversion and can luminesce when doped with rare-earth ions.
