= Scandium triiodide =

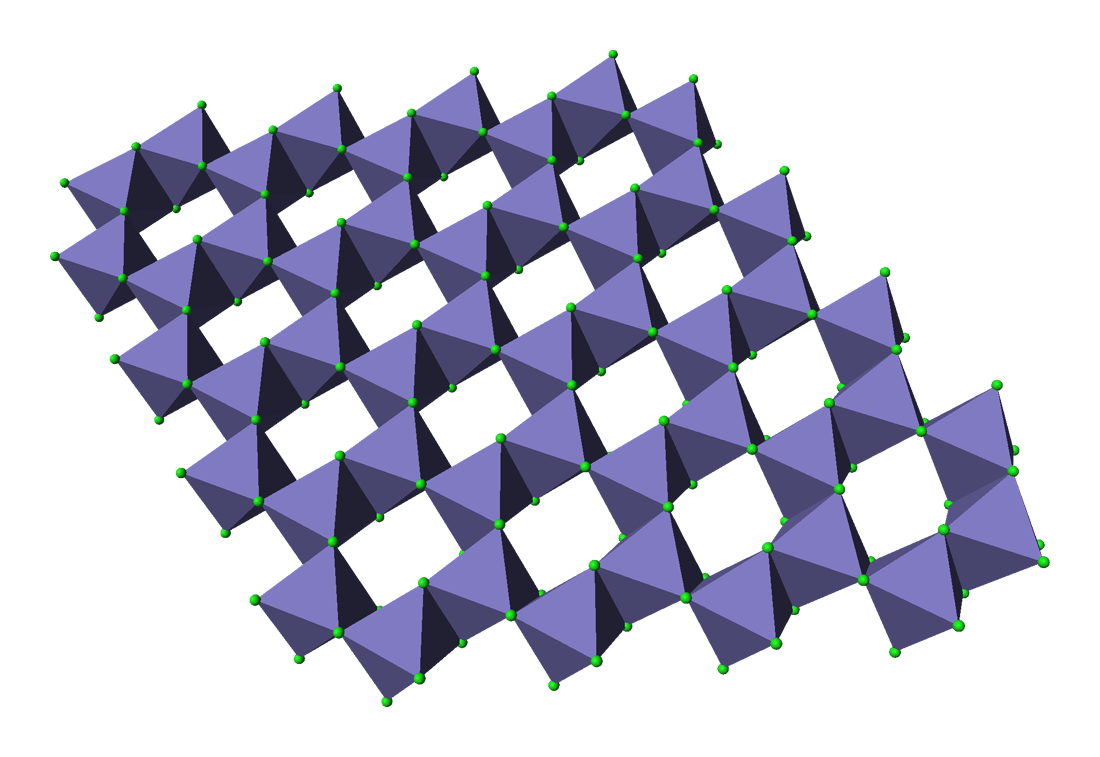

Names
- IUPAC name Scandium triiodide
- Other names Scandium(III) iodide Scandium(3+) triiodide Triiodoscandium

Identifiers
CAS Number	14474-33-0
3D model (JSmol)	Interactive image
ChemSpider	76193
ECHA InfoCard	100.034.956
EC Number	238-469-0
PubChem CID	4420285
UNII	QVJ18SK04T
CompTox Dashboard (EPA)	DTXSID00932397
- InChI: InChI=1S/3HI.Sc/h3*1H;/q;;;+3/p-3 Key: HUIHCQPFSRNMNM-UHFFFAOYSA-K
- SMILES: [Sc](I)(I)I

Properties
Chemical formula	ScI_{3}
Molar mass	425.66
Appearance	Yellowish solid
Melting point	920 °C (1,690 °F; 1,190 K)

Related compounds
Other anions	Scandium fluoride Scandium chloride Scandium bromide
Other cations	Yttrium(III) iodide Lutetium(III) iodide
- Except where otherwise noted, data are given for materials in their standard state (at 25 °C [77 °F], 100 kPa). Infobox references

Scandium triiodide, also known as scandium iodide, is an inorganic compound with the formula ScI_{3} Sometimes classified as a rare earth iodide, this compound is a yellowish powder. It is used in metal halide lamps together with similar compounds, such as caesium iodide, because of their ability to maximize emission of UV and to prolong bulb life. The maximized UV emission can be tuned to a range that can initiate photopolymerizations.

Scandium triiodide adopts a structure similar to that of iron trichloride (FeCl_{3}), crystallizing into a rhombohedral lattice. Scandium has a coordination number of 6, while iodine has a coordination number of 3 and is trigonal pyramidal.

High purity scandium triiodide is obtained through direct reaction of the elements:

2 Sc + 3 I_{2} → 2 ScI_{3}

Alternatively, but less effectively, one can produce anhydrous scandium triiodide by dehydrating ScI_{3}(H_{2}O)_{6}.

The octahydrate is also known: formula ScI_{3}(H_{2}O)_{8}.

== Further information ==
- Tomasz Mioduski, Cezary Gumiski, and Dewen Zeng "Rare Earth Metal Iodides and Bromides in Water and Aqueous Systems. Part 1. Iodides" Journal of Physical and Chemical Reference Data 2012, vol. 41, 013104-1 to 013104-63. doi:10.1063/1.3682093
