= Scandium bromide =

Scandium(III) bromide
Names
- IUPAC name Tribromoscandium
- Other names Scandium tribromide

Identifiers
CAS Number	13465-59-3
3D model (JSmol)	Interactive image
ChemSpider	75332
ECHA InfoCard	100.033.349
EC Number	236-699-6
PubChem CID	83495
CompTox Dashboard (EPA)	DTXSID0065486
- InChI: InChI=1S/3BrH.Sc/h3*1H;/q;;;+3/p-3 Key: APPHYFNIXVIIJR-UHFFFAOYSA-K
- SMILES: Br[Sc](Br)Br

Properties
Chemical formula	ScBr_{3}
Molar mass	284.67 g/mol
Appearance	anhydrous powder
Density	3.914 g/cm^{3}
Melting point	904 °C (1,659 °F; 1,177 K)
Solubility in water	soluble
Solubility	soluble in ethanol

Thermochemistry
Std enthalpy of formation (Δ_{f}H^{⦵}_{298})	−2.455 kJ/g

Hazards
NFPA 704 (fire diamond)	0 0 0

Related compounds
Other anions	Scandium fluoride Scandium chloride Scandium triiodide
Other cations	Yttrium(III) bromide Lutetium(III) bromide
- Except where otherwise noted, data are given for materials in their standard state (at 25 °C [77 °F], 100 kPa). Infobox references

Scandium bromide refers to inorganic compounds with the formula ScBr_{3}(H_{2}O)_{n}. The anhydrous trihalide is hygroscopic. Both anhydrous and the hydrate are water soluble, diamagnetic, and colorless.

== Preparation and properties ==
ScBr_{3} can be produced by "burning" scandium in bromine gas.

2 Sc + 3 Br_{2} → 2 ScBr_{3}

Scandium bromide can also be prepared by treating excess hydrobromic acid with scandium oxide. The heptahydrate can be crystallized from the solution. According to X-ray crystallogrphy, [Sc(H_{2}O)_{7}]Br_{3} featureseven-coordinate Sc^{3+}. The thermal decomposition of the hydrate yields scandium oxybromide (ScOBr) and scandium oxide. The anhydrous form can be produced by the reaction of bromine, scandium oxide and graphite in nitrogen gas.

Heating reaction between ammonium bromide and scandium oxide or scandium bromide hexahydrate, through (NH_{4})_{3}ScBr_{6} intermediate, decomposes to obtain anhydrous scandium bromide.

== Uses ==
Scandium bromide is used for solid state synthesis of unusual clusters such as Sc_{19}Br_{28}Z_{4}, (Z=Mn, Fe, Os or Ru). These clusters are of interest for their structure and magnetic properties.
