= Yttrium iodide =

Names
- Other names Triiodoyttrium, yttrium triiodide, yttrium(3+) triiodide

Identifiers
CAS Number	13470-38-7
3D model (JSmol)	Interactive image
ChemSpider	75345
ECHA InfoCard	100.033.383
EC Number	236-737-1
PubChem CID	83510
UNII	IWJ2Y80D1J
CompTox Dashboard (EPA)	DTXSID9065499
- InChI: InChI=1S/3HI.Y/h3*1H;/q;;;+3/p-3 Key: LFWQXIMAKJCMJL-UHFFFAOYSA-K
- SMILES: [Y](I)(I)I

Properties
Chemical formula	YI_{3}
Molar mass	469.6193 g/mol
Appearance	Colorless crystals
Melting point	1,000 °C (1,830 °F; 1,270 K)
Boiling point	1,310 °C (2,390 °F; 1,580 K)
Solubility in water	Soluble
- Except where otherwise noted, data are given for materials in their standard state (at 25 °C [77 °F], 100 kPa). Infobox references

Yttrium iodide is a binary inorganic compound, a salt of yttrium and hydroiodic acid with the formula YI_{3}. The compound forms colorless crystals, soluble in water.

== Synthesis ==
1. Heating yttrium and iodine in an inert atmosphere:

2 Y + 3 I_{2} → 2 YI_{3}

2. Heating yttrium oxide with ammonium iodide:

Y_{2}O_{3} + 6 NH_{4}I → 2 YI_{3} + 6 NH_{3} + 3 H_{2}O

It can also be obtained by reacting yttrium oxide or yttrium hydroxide with hydroiodic acid.

== Physical properties ==
Yttrium iodide forms colorless flaky crystals. The crystal structure is that of the BiI_{3} structure type.

It dissolves well in water and ethanol. Does not dissolve in diethyl ether.

It also occurs as a tri- and hexahydrate.

== Applications ==
A precursor for YBCO superconducting materials in a lower temperature preparation.
