= Pearson–Anson effect =

Pearson-Anson oscillator circuit

The Pearson–Anson effect, discovered in 1922 by Stephen Oswald Pearson and Horatio Saint George Anson, is the phenomenon of an oscillating electric voltage produced by a neon bulb connected across a capacitor, when a direct current is applied through a resistor. This circuit, now called the Pearson-Anson oscillator, neon lamp oscillator, or sawtooth oscillator, is one of the simplest types of relaxation oscillator. It generates a sawtooth output waveform. It has been used in low frequency applications such as blinking warning lights, stroboscopes, tone generators in electronic organs and other electronic music circuits, and in time base generators and deflection circuits of early cathode-ray tube oscilloscopes. Since the development of microelectronics, these simple negative resistance oscillators have been superseded in many applications by more flexible semiconductor relaxation oscillators such as the 555 timer IC.

== Neon bulb as a switching device ==
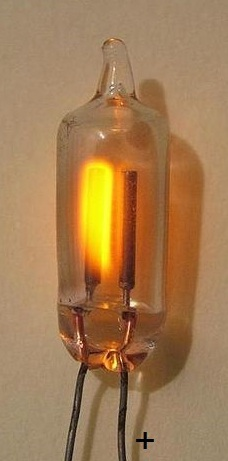
NE-2 neon lamp

A neon bulb, often used as an indicator lamp in appliances, consists of a glass bulb containing two electrodes, separated by an inert gas such as neon at low pressure. Its nonlinear current-voltage characteristics (diagram below) allow it to function as a switching device.

When a voltage is applied across the electrodes, the gas conducts almost no electric current until a threshold voltage is reached (point b), called the firing or breakdown voltage, V_{b}. At this voltage electrons in the gas are accelerated to a high enough speed to knock other electrons off gas atoms, which go on to knock off more electrons in a chain reaction. The gas in the bulb ionizes, starting a glow discharge, and its resistance drops to a low value. In its conducting state the current through the bulb is limited only by the external circuit. The voltage across the bulb drops to a lower voltage called the maintaining voltage V_{m}. The bulb will continue to conduct current until the applied voltage drops below the extinction voltage V_{e} (point d), which is usually close to the maintaining voltage. Below this voltage, the current provides insufficient energy to keep the gas ionized, so the bulb switches back to its high resistance, nonconductive state (point a).

The bulb's "turn on" voltage V_{b} is higher than its "turn off" voltage V_{e}. This property, called hysteresis, allows the bulb to function as an oscillator. Hysteresis is due to the bulb's negative resistance, the fall in voltage with increasing current after breakdown, which is a property of all gas-discharge lamps.

Up until the 1960s sawtooth oscillators were also built with thyratrons. These were gas-filled triode electron tubes. These worked somewhat similarly to neon bulbs, the tube would not conduct until the cathode to anode voltage reached a breakdown voltage. The advantage of the thyratron was that the breakdown voltage could be controlled by the voltage on the grid. This allowed the frequency of the oscillation to be changed electronically. Thyratron oscillators were used as time base generators in oscilloscopes.

== Operation ==
IV curve of neon bulb (right) showing the oscillator hysteresis loop (abcd), the load line (blue). The vertical axis is the voltage across the bulb and the horizontal axis is the current through the bulb. The load line must lie within the shaded region for the circuit to oscillate. Graph at left is the output waveforms; v is the voltage across the bulb and i is the current through it.

In the Pearson-Anson oscillator circuit (top) a capacitor C is connected across the neon bulb N The capacitor is continuously charged by current through the resistor R until the bulb conducts, discharging it again, after which it charges up again. The detailed cycle is illustrated by the hysteresis loop abcd on the current-voltage diagram at right:

- When the supply voltage is turned on, the neon bulb is in its high resistance condition and acts like an open circuit. The current through the resistor begins to charge the capacitor and its voltage begins to rise toward the supply voltage.
- When the voltage across the capacitor reaches b, the breakdown voltage of the bulb V_{b}, the bulb turns on and its resistance drops to a low value. The charge on the capacitor discharges rapidly through the bulb in a momentary pulse of current (c).
- When the voltage drops to the extinction voltage V_{e} of the bulb (d), the bulb turns off and the current through it drops to a low level (a). The current through the resistor begins charging the capacitor up again, and the cycle repeats.

The circuit thus functions as a low-frequency relaxation oscillator, the capacitor voltage oscillating between the breakdown and extinction voltages of the bulb in a sawtooth wave. The period is proportional to the time constant RC.

The neon lamp produces a brief flash of light each time it conducts, so the circuit can also be used as a "flasher" circuit. The dual function of the lamp as both light source and switching device gives the circuit a lower parts count and cost than many alternative flasher circuits.

== Conditions for oscillation ==
The supply voltage V_{S} must be greater than the bulb breakdown voltage V_{b} or the bulb can never conduct. Most small neon lamps have breakdown voltages between 80 and 150 volts, so they can operate on 120 Vrms mains voltage, which has a peak voltage of about 170 V. If the supply voltage is close to the breakdown voltage, the capacitor voltage will be in the "tail" of its exponential curve by the time it reaches V_{b}, so the frequency will depend sensitively on the breakdown threshold and supply voltage levels, causing variations in frequency. Therefore, the supply voltage is usually made significantly higher than the bulb firing voltage. This also makes the charging more linear, and the sawtooth wave more triangular.

The resistor R must also be within a certain range of values for the circuit to oscillate. This is illustrated by the load line (blue) on the IV graph. The slope of the load line is equal to R. The possible DC operating points of the circuit are at the intersection of the load line and the neon lamp's IV curve (black) In order for the circuit to be unstable and oscillate, the load line must intersect the IV curve in its negative resistance region, between b and d, where the voltage declines with increasing current. This is defined by the shaded region on the diagram. If the load line crosses the IV curve where it has positive resistance, outside the shaded region, this represents a stable operating point, so the circuit will not oscillate:

- If R is too large, of the same order as the "off" leakage resistance of the bulb, the load line will cross the IV curve between the origin and b. In this region, the current through R from the supply is so low that the leakage current through the bulb bleeds it off, so the capacitor voltage never reaches V_{b} and the bulb never fires. The leakage resistance of most neon bulbs is greater than 100MΩ, so this is not a serious limitation.
- If R is too small, the load line will cross the IV curve between c and d. In this region the current through R is too large; once the bulb has turned on, the current through R will be large enough to keep it conducting without current from the capacitor, and the voltage across the bulb will never fall to V_{e} so the bulb will never turn off.

Small neon bulbs will typically oscillate with values of R between 500kΩ and 20MΩ. If C is not small, it may be necessary to add a resistor in series with the neon bulb, to limit current through it to prevent damage when the capacitor discharges. This will increase the discharge time and decrease the frequency slightly, but its effect will be negligible at low frequencies.

== Frequency ==
The period of oscillation can be calculated from the breakdown and extinction voltage thresholds of the lamp used. During the charging period, the bulb has high resistance and can be considered an open circuit, so the rest of the oscillator constitutes an RC circuit with the capacitor voltage approaching V_{S} exponentially, with time constant RC. If v(t) is the output voltage across the capacitor

Derivation of v(t)
and i(t) is the current through the resistor

$V_S = v + Ri\,$ and $i = C{dv \over dt}\,$

so the differential equation of the circuit is

$$RC{dv \over dt} + v = V_S \,$$

The general solution is

$$v(t) = A_1e^{-t/RC} + A_2 \,$$

Applying boundary conditions $v(\infty) = A_2 = V_S \,$ and $v(0) = A_1 + V_S = 0 \,$ gives the constants A_{1} and A_{2}, so the solution is

$$v(t) = V_S(1 - e^{-t/RC}) \,$$

Solving for the time

$$t = RC\ln\Bigl[{V_S \over {V_S - v}}\Bigr] \,$$

Although the first period is longer than the others because the voltage starts from zero, the voltage waveforms of subsequent periods are identical to the first between V_{e} and V_{b}. So the period T is the interval between the time when the voltage reaches V_{e}, and the time when the voltage reaches V_{b}

$$T = t(V_b) - t(V_e) \,$$

$$T = RC\ln\Bigl[{V_S \over {V_S - V_b}}\Bigr] - RC\ln\Bigl[{V_S \over {V_S - V_e}}\Bigr]\,$$

$$T = RC\ln\Bigl[{{V_S - V_e} \over {V_S - V_b}}\Bigr]\,\,\,\,\,\,\,\,$$

This formula is only valid for oscillation frequencies up to about 200 Hz; above this various time delays cause the actual frequency to be lower than this. Due to the time required to ionize and deionize the gas, neon lamps are slow switching devices, and the neon lamp oscillator is limited to a top frequency of about 20 kHz. The breakdown and extinction voltages of neon lamps may vary between similar parts; manufacturers usually specify only wide ranges for these parameters. So if a precise frequency is desired the circuit must be adjusted by trial and error. The thresholds also change with temperature, so the frequency of neon lamp oscillators is not particularly stable.

== Forced oscillations and chaotic behavior ==
Like other relaxation oscillators, the neon bulb oscillator has poor frequency stability, but it can be synchronized (entrained) to an external periodic voltage applied in series with the neon bulb. Even if the external frequency is different from the natural frequency of the oscillator, the peaks of the applied signal can exceed the breakdown threshold of the bulb, discharging the capacitor prematurely, so that the period of the oscillator becomes locked to the applied signal.

Interesting behavior can result from varying the amplitude and frequency of the external voltage. For instance, the oscillator may produce an oscillating voltage whose frequency is a submultiple of the external frequency. This phenomenon is known as "submultiplication" or "demultiplication", and was first observed in 1927 by Balthasar van der Pol and his collaborator Jan van der Mark. In some cases the ratio of the external frequency to the frequency of the oscillation observed in the circuit may be a rational number, or even an irrational one (the latter case is known as the "quasiperiodic" regime). When the periodic and quasiperiodic regimes overlap, the behavior of the circuit may become aperiodic, meaning that the pattern of the oscillations never repeats. This aperiodicity correspond to the behavior of the circuit becoming chaotic (see chaos theory).

The forced neon bulb oscillator was the first system in which chaotic behavior was observed. Van der Pol and van der Mark wrote, concerning their experiments with demultiplication, that

Often an irregular noise is heard in the telephone receivers before the frequency jumps to the next lower value. However this is a subsidiary phenomenon, the main effect being the regular frequency demultiplication.

Any periodic oscillation would have produced a musical tone; only aperiodic, chaotic oscillations would produce an "irregular noise". This is thought to have been the first observation of chaos, although van der Pol and van der Mark didn't realize its significance at the time.

== See also ==
- Relaxation oscillator
- Schmitt trigger
- 555 timer
- Negative resistance
