= Neon lamp =

Light source based on gas discharge

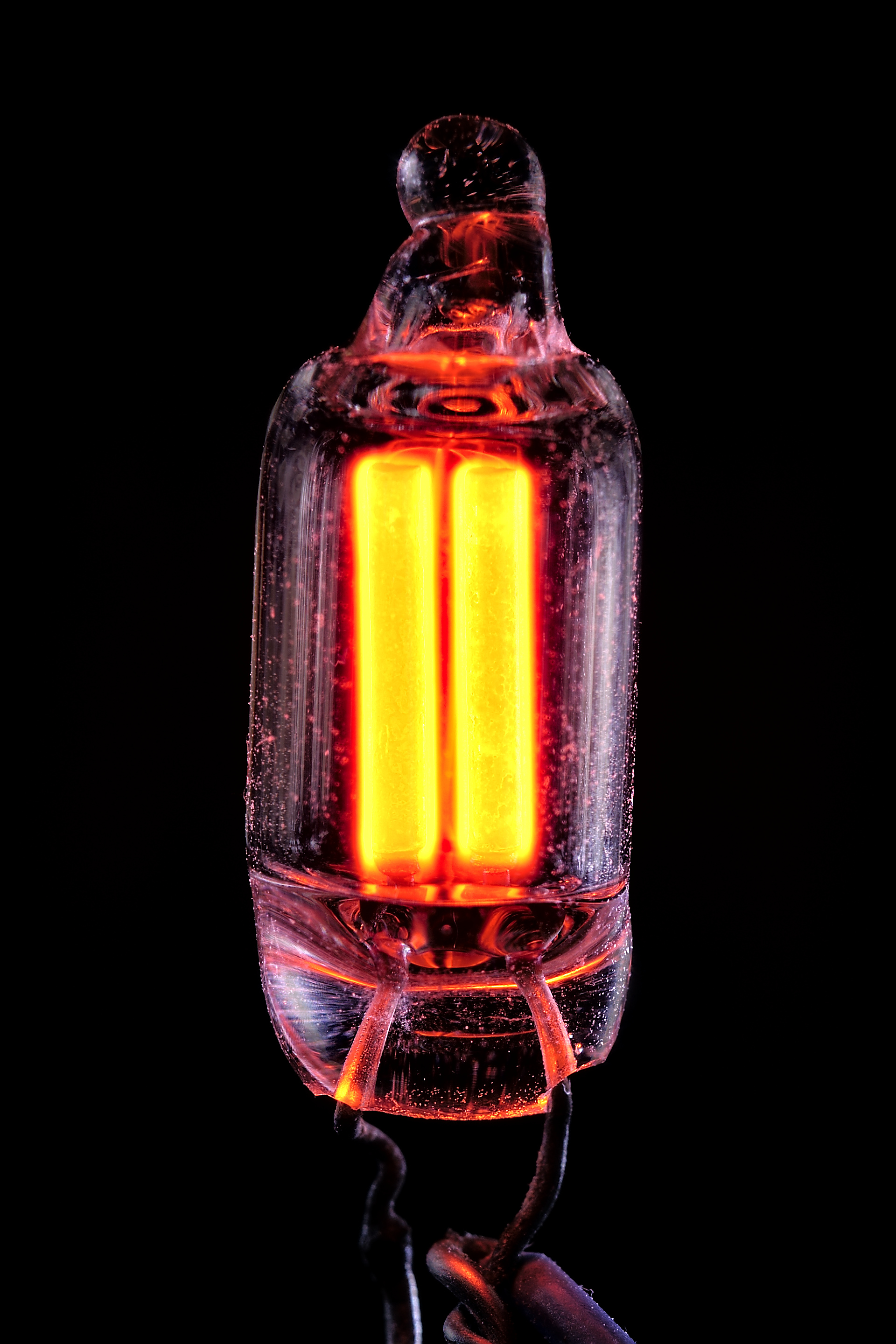
NE-2 type neon lamp powered by alternating current (AC)

Neon lamp schematic symbol

A neon lamp (also neon glow lamp) is a miniature gas-discharge lamp. The lamp typically consists of a small glass capsule that contains a mixture of neon and other gases at a low pressure and two electrodes (an anode and a cathode). When sufficient voltage is applied and sufficient current is supplied between the electrodes, the lamp produces an orange glow discharge. The glowing portion in the lamp is a thin region near the cathode; the larger and much longer neon signs are also glow discharges, but they use the positive column which is not present in the ordinary neon lamp. Neon glow lamps were widely used as indicator lamps in the displays of electronic instruments and appliances. They are still sometimes used for their electrical simplicity in high-voltage circuits.

== History ==
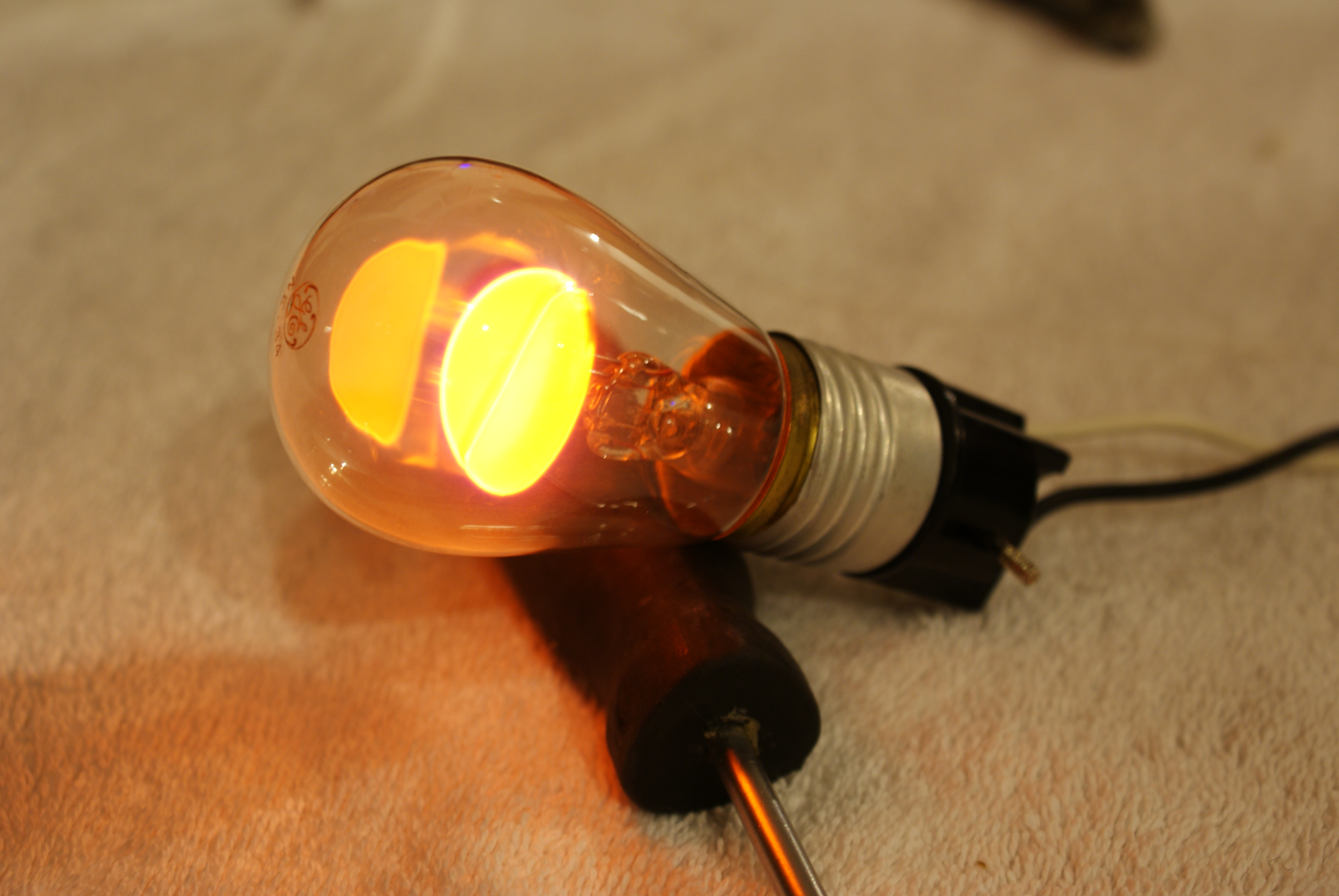
A General Electric NE-34 glow lamp, manufactured circa 1930

Neon was discovered in 1898 by William Ramsay and Morris Travers. The characteristic, brilliant red color that is emitted by gaseous neon when excited electrically was noted immediately; Travers later wrote, "the blaze of crimson light from the tube told its own story and was a sight to dwell upon and never forget."

Neon's scarcity precluded its prompt application for electrical lighting along the lines of Moore tubes, which used electric discharges in nitrogen. Moore tubes were commercialized by their inventor, Daniel McFarlan Moore, in the early 1900s. After 1902, Georges Claude's company, Air Liquide, was producing industrial quantities of neon as a byproduct of his air liquefaction business, and in December 1910 Claude demonstrated modern neon lighting based on a sealed tube of neon. In 1915 a U.S. patent was issued to Claude covering the design of the electrodes for neon tube lights; this patent became the basis for the monopoly held in the U.S. by his company, Claude Neon Lights, through the early 1930s.

Around 1917, Daniel Moore developed the neon lamp while working at the General Electric Company. The lamp has a very different design from the much larger neon tubes used for neon lighting. The difference in design was sufficient that a U.S. patent was issued for the lamp in 1919. A Smithsonian Institution website notes, "These small, low power devices use a physical principle called coronal discharge. Moore mounted two electrodes close together in a bulb and added neon or argon gas. The electrodes would glow brightly in red or blue, depending on the gas, and the lamps lasted for years. Since the electrodes could take almost any shape imaginable, a popular application has been fanciful decorative lamps."

Glow lamps found practical use as indicators in instrument panels and in many home appliances until the widespread commercialization of light-emitting diodes (LEDs) in the 1970s.

== Description ==
Voltage-current characteristics of electrical discharge in neon at 1 torr, with two planar electrodes separated by 50 cm. A: random pulses by cosmic radiation B: saturation current C: Avalanche breakdown Townsend discharge D: self-sustained Townsend discharge E: unstable region: corona discharge F: sub-normal glow discharge G: normal glow discharge H: abnormal glow discharge I: unstable region: glow-arc transition J: electric arc K: electric arc A-D region: dark discharge; ionisation occurs, current below 10 microamps. F-H region: glow discharge; the plasma emits a faint glow. I-K region: arc discharge; large amounts of electromagnetic radiation produced.

A small electric current (for a 5 mm bulb diameter NE-2 lamp, the quiescent current is about 400 μA), which may be AC or DC, is allowed through the tube, causing it to glow orange-red. The gas is typically a Penning mixture, 99.5% neon and 0.5% argon, which has lower striking voltage than pure neon, at a pressure of 1–20 torrs (0.13–2.67 kPa).

The lamp glow discharge lights at its striking voltage. The striking voltage is reduced by ambient light or radioactivity. To reduce the "dark effect", some lamps were made with a small amount of radioactive material, typically Krypton-85, added to the envelope to provide ionization in darkness.

The voltage required to sustain the discharge is significantly (up to 30%) lower than the striking voltage. This is due to the organization of positive ions near the cathode. Neon lamps operate using a low current glow discharge.

Higher power devices, such as mercury-vapor lamps or metal halide lamps use a higher current arc discharge. Low pressure sodium-vapor lamps use a neon Penning mixture for warm up and can be operated as giant neon lamps if operated in a low power mode.

=== Limiting current ===
Once the neon lamp has reached breakdown, it can support a large current flow. Because of this characteristic, electrical circuitry external to the neon lamp must limit the current through the circuit or else the current will rapidly increase until the lamp is destroyed.

For indicator-sized lamps, a resistor typically limits the current. In contrast, larger sized lamps often use a specially constructed high voltage transformer with high leakage inductance or other electrical ballast to limit the available current (see neon sign).

=== Flicker flame ===
When the current through the lamp is lower than the current for the highest-current discharge path, the glow discharge may become unstable and not cover the entire surface of the electrodes. This may be a sign of aging of the indicator lamp, and is exploited in the decorative "flicker flame" neon lamps. However, while too low a current causes flickering, too high a current increases the wear of the electrodes by stimulating sputtering, which coats the internal surface of the lamp with metal and causes it to darken.

The potential needed to strike the discharge is higher than what is needed to sustain the discharge. When there is not enough current, the glow forms around only part of the electrode surface. Convective currents make the glowing areas flow upwards, not unlike the discharge in a Jacob's ladder. A photoionization effect can also be observed here, as the electrode area covered by the glow discharge can be increased by shining light at the lamp.

=== Efficiency ===
In comparison with incandescent lamps, neon lamps have much higher luminous efficacy. Incandescence is heat-driven light emission, so a large portion of the electric energy put into an incandescent lamp is converted into heat. Non-incandescent light sources such as neon lamps, fluorescent lamps, and light-emitting diodes are therefore much more energy efficient than normal incandescent lamps. LEDs are the highest efficiency.

Green neon lamps can produce up to 65 lumens per watt of power input, while white neon lamps have an efficacy of around 50 lumens per watt. In contrast, a standard incandescent lamp only produces around 13.5 lumens per watt.

=== Environmental effects ===
The precise values of starting and maintaining voltages of neon lamps is subject to change due to several effects. External light falling on the electrodes provides a source of ionization to start the lamp; in total darkness, lamps may reach a high and erratic starting voltage. One measure to mitigate for this effect is to include a pilot lamp within the enclosure to provide an initial source of light. Lamps are also somewhat sensitive to external electrostatic fields, temperature, and aging. Lamps intended for use as circuit components may be specially processed to eliminate most of the initial aging effects.

== Applications ==
=== Visual indicator ===
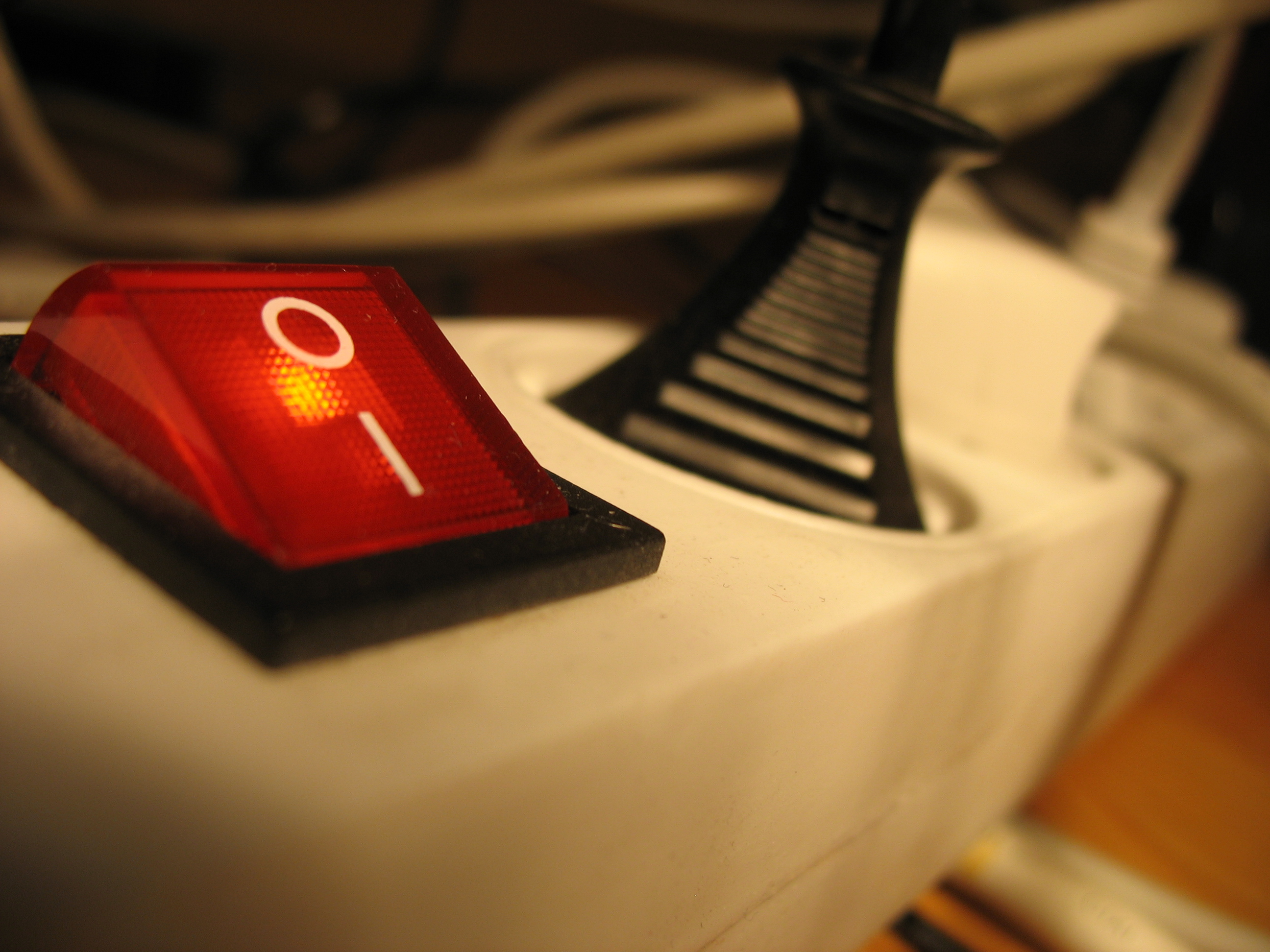
Switch on a power strip, illuminated by a neon lamp

Even after the widespread availability of cheap LEDs, small neon lamps are still widely used as visual indicators in electronic equipment and appliances, due to their low power consumption, long life, and ability to operate on mains power.

=== Voltage surge suppression ===
Neon lamps are commonly used as low-voltage surge protectors, but they are generally inferior to gas discharge tube (GDT) surge protectors (which can be designed for higher voltage applications). Neon lamps have been used as an inexpensive method to protect RF receivers from voltage spikes (lamp connected to RF input and chassis ground), but they are not suitable for higher-power RF transmitters.

=== Voltage tester ===
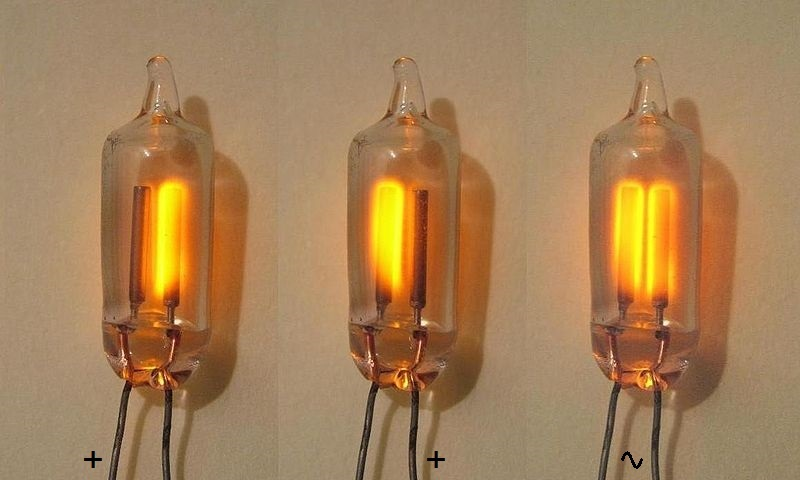
+DC (left), -DC (center), AC (right) supplied to NE-2 type neon lamps

Most small neon (indicator-sized) lamps, such as the common NE-2, have a break-down voltage of around 90 volts. When driven from a DC source, only the negatively charged electrode (cathode) will glow. When driven from an AC source, both electrodes will glow (each during alternate half cycles). These attributes make neon lamps (with series resistors) a convenient low-cost voltage tester. By examining which electrode is glowing they can reveal whether a given voltage source is AC or DC, and if DC, the polarity of the points being tested.

=== Voltage regulation ===
The breakdown characteristic of glow-discharge lamps allows them to be used as voltage regulators or overvoltage protection devices. Starting around the 1930s, General Electric (GE), Signalite, and other firms made voltage regulator tubes.

=== Switching element/oscillator ===
Like other gas discharge lamps, the neon lamp has negative resistance; its voltage falls with increasing current after the lamp reaches its breakdown voltage. Therefore, the lamp has hysteresis; its turn-off (extinction) voltage is lower than its turn-on (breakdown) voltage.

This allows it to be used as an active switching element. Neon lamps were used to make relaxation oscillator circuits, using this mechanism, sometimes referred to as the Pearson–Anson effect for low frequency applications such as flashing warning lights, stroboscopes tone generators in electronic organs, and as time bases and deflection oscillators in early cathode ray oscilloscopes.

Neon lamps can also be bistable, and were even used to build digital logic circuits such as logic gates, flip-flop, binary memories, and digital counters. These applications were sufficiently common that manufacturers made neon lamps specifically for this use, sometimes called "circuit-component" lamps. At least some of these lamps have a glow concentrated into a small spot on the cathode, which made them unsuited to use as indicators. To provide more repeatable lamp characteristics and reduce "dark effect" ( a rise in starting voltage observed in lamps kept in total darkness), some types of lamp such as NE83 (5AH) include a small amount of a radioisotope to provide initial ionization.

A variant of the NE-2 type lamp for circuit applications, the NE-77, have three wire electrodes in the lamp (in a plane) instead of the usual two, the third for use as a control electrode.

=== Detector ===
Neon lamps have been historically used as microwave and millimeter-wave detectors ("plasma diodes" or glow discharge detectors (GDDs)) up to about 100 GHz or so and in such service were said to exhibit comparable sensitivity (of the order of a few 10s to perhaps 100 microvolts) to the familiar 1N23-type catwhisker-contacted silicon diodes once ubiquitous in microwave equipment. More recently it has been found that these lamps work well as detectors even at sub-millimeter ("terahertz") frequencies and they have been successfully used as pixels in several experimental imaging arrays at these wavelengths.

In these applications the lamps are operated either in "starvation" mode (to reduce lamp-current noise) or in normal glow discharge mode; some literature references their use as detectors of radiation up into the optical regime when operated in abnormal glow mode. Coupling of microwaves into the plasma may be in free space, in waveguide, by means of a parabolic concentrator (e.g., Winston cone), or via capacitive means via a loop or dipole antenna mounted directly to the lamp.

Although most of these applications use ordinary off-the-shelf dual-electrode lamps, in one case it was found that special three (or more) electrode lamps, with the extra electrode acting as the coupling antenna, provided even better results (lower noise and higher sensitivity). This discovery received a US patent.

=== Alphanumerical display ===
The digits of a Nixie tube.

Neon lamps with several shaped electrodes were used as alphanumerical displays known as Nixie tubes. These have since been replaced by other display devices such as light emitting diodes, vacuum fluorescent displays, and liquid crystal displays.

Since at least the 1940s, argon, neon, and phosphored glow thyratron latching indicators (which would light up upon an impulse on their starter electrode and extinguish only after their anode voltage was cut) were available for example as self-displaying shift registers in large-format, crawling-text dot-matrix displays, or, combined in a 4×4, four-color phosphored-thyratron matrix, as a stackable 625-color RGBA pixel for large video graphics arrays. Multiple-cathode and/or anode glow thyratrons called Dekatrons could count forwards and backwards while their count state was visible as a glow on one of the numbered cathodes. These were used as self-displaying divide-by-n counter/timer/prescalers in counting instruments, or as adder/subtracters in calculators.

=== Other ===
In 1930s radio sets, neon lamps were used as tuning indicators, called "tuneons" and would give a brighter glow as the station was tuned in correctly.

Because of their comparatively short response time, in the early development of television neon lamps were used as the light source in many mechanical-scan TV displays.

Novelty glow lamps with shaped electrodes (such as flowers and leaves), often coated with phosphors, have been made for artistic purposes. In some of these, the glow that surrounds an electrode is part of the design.

== Color ==
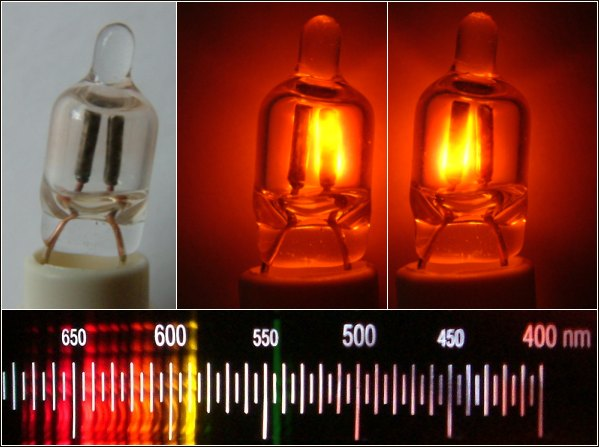
Unlit and lit neon lamps (NE-2 type) and their light spectrum.

Neon indicator lamps are normally orange, and are frequently used with a colored filter over them to improve contrast and change their color to red or a redder orange.

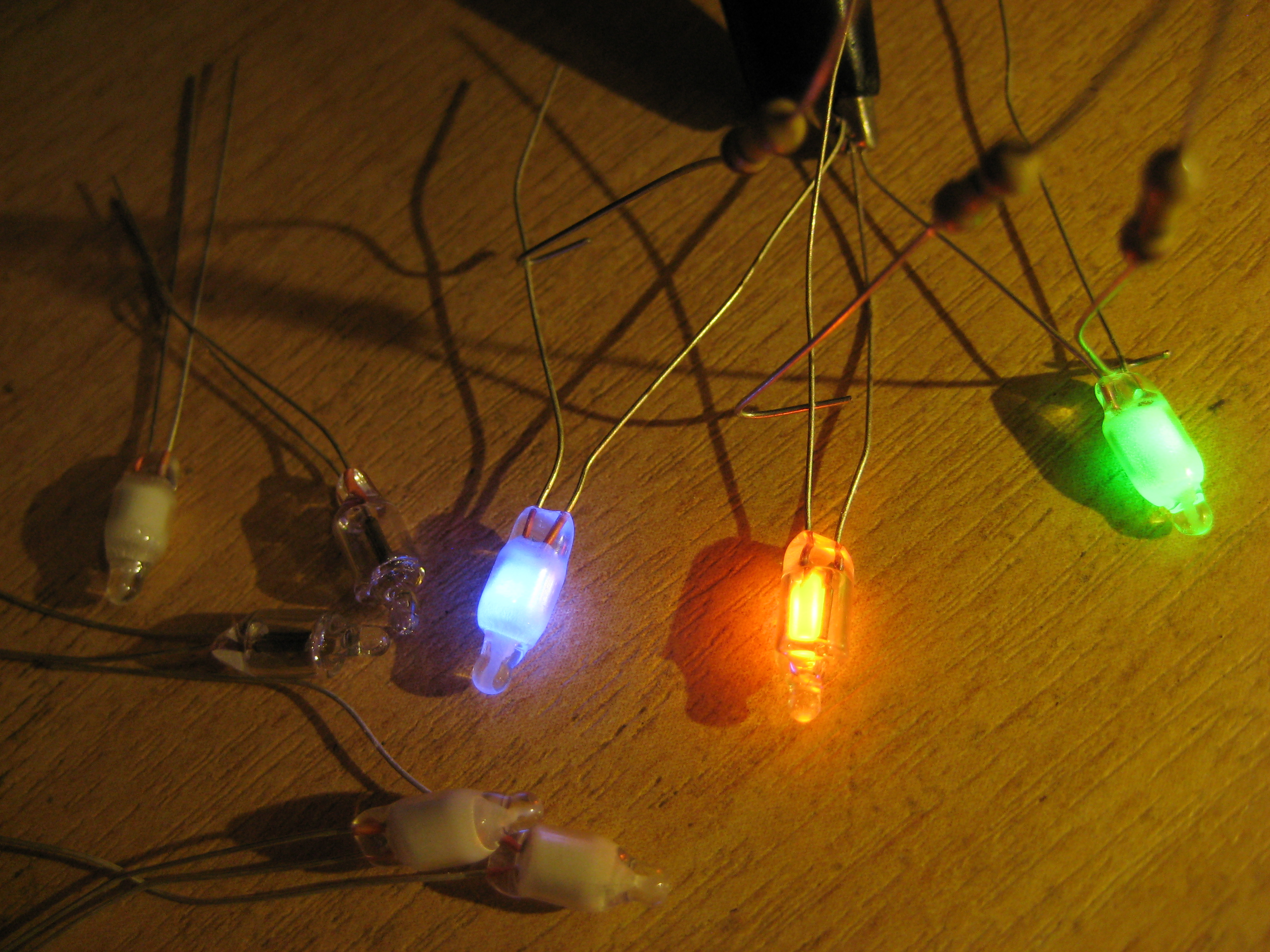
Phosphor-colored neon lamps

They can also be filled with argon, krypton, or xenon rather than neon, or mixed with it. While the electrical operating characteristics remain similar, these lamps light with a bluish glow (including some ultraviolet) rather than neon's characteristic reddish-orange glow. Ultraviolet radiation then can be used to excite a phosphor coating inside of the bulb and provide a wide range of various colors, including white. A mixture of 95% neon, 2.5% krypton, and 2.5% xenon can be used for a green glow, but nevertheless "green neon" lamps are more commonly phosphor-based.

== See also ==
- Aerolux Light Corporation
- Gas-filled tube
- Light art
- List of light sources
- Magic eye tube
- Neon sign
- Pearson–Anson effect
- Timeline of lighting technology
