= Sodium-vapor lamp =

Type of electric gas-discharge lamp

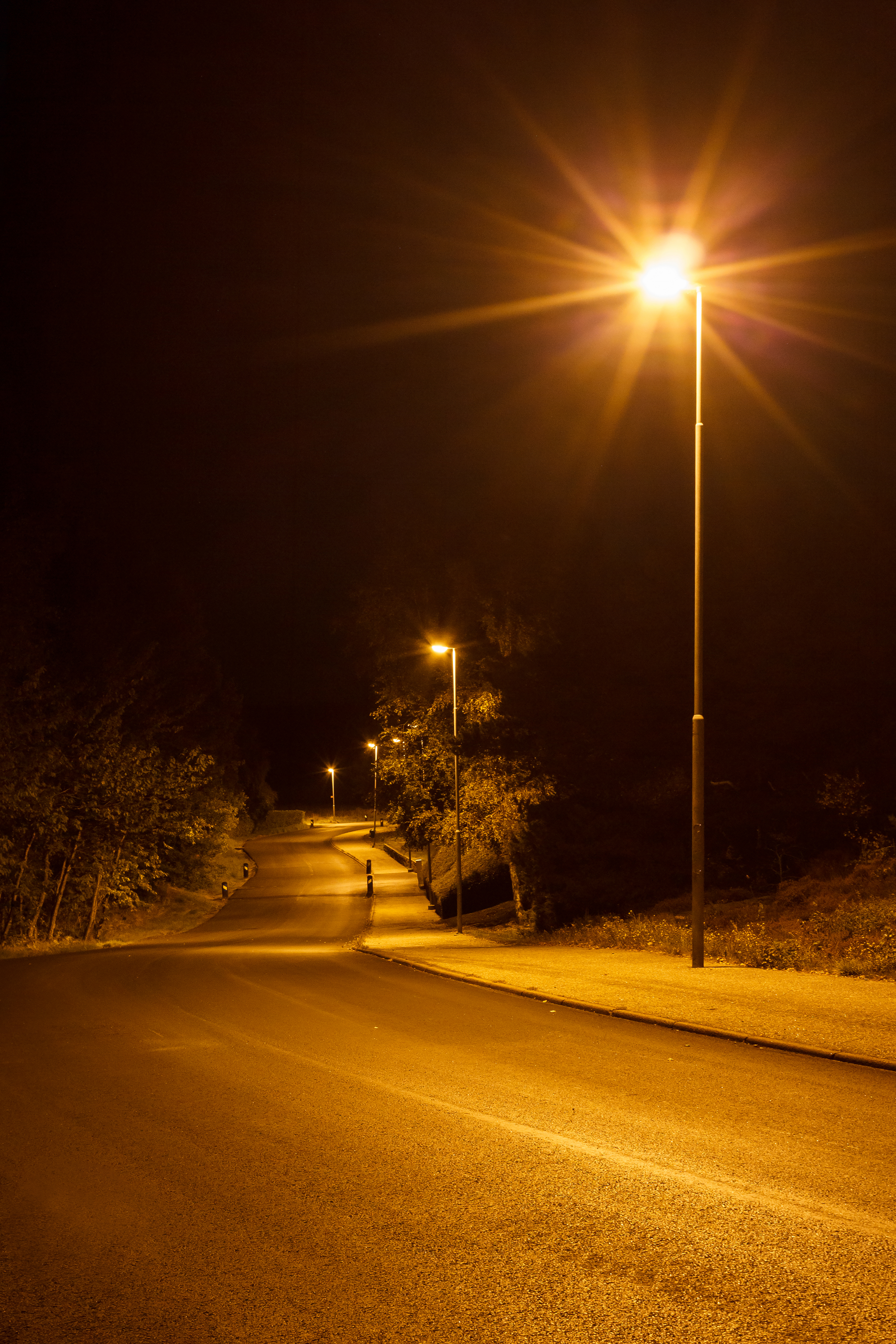
Sodium street lights in Tuntorp, Sweden

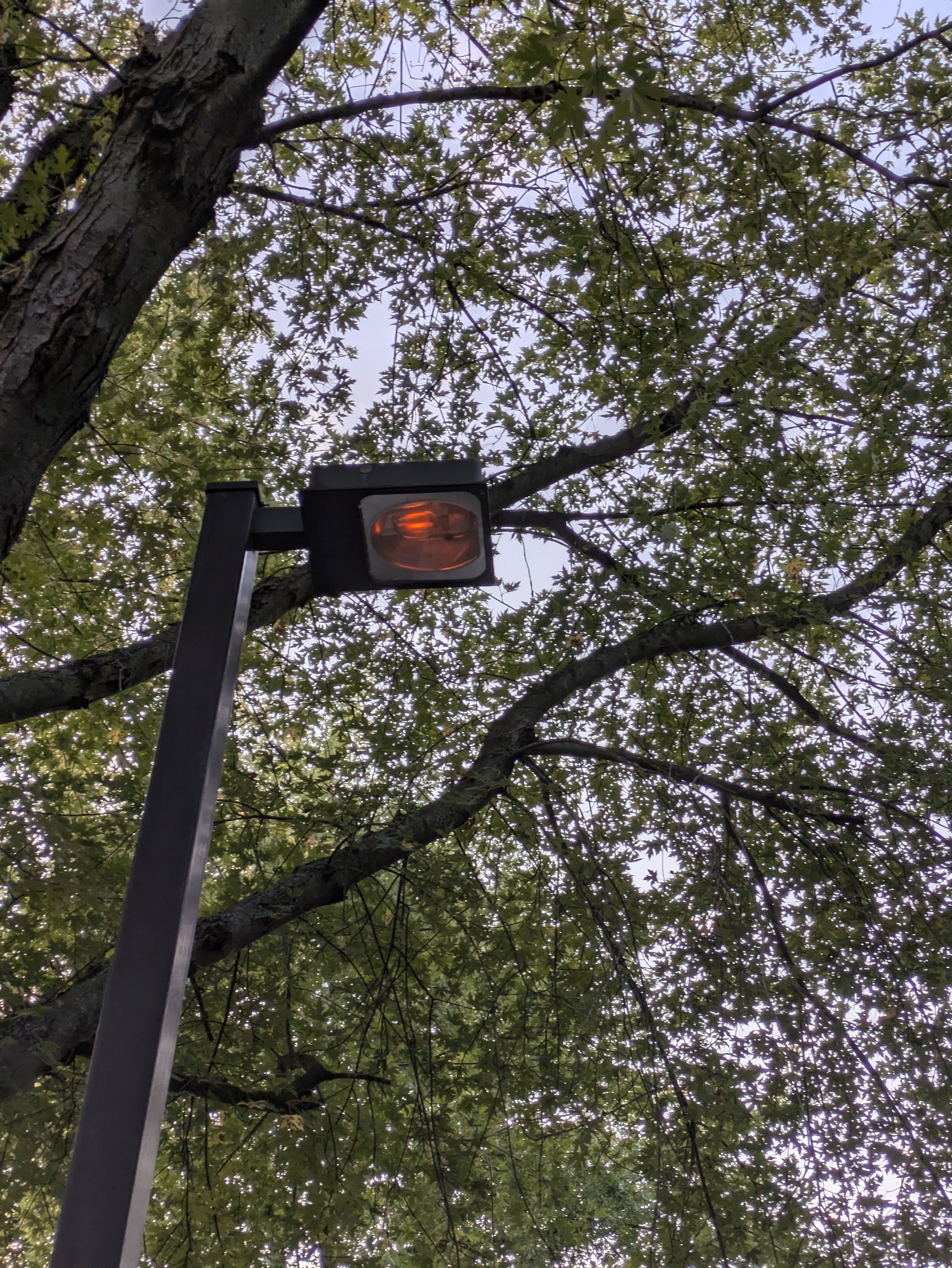
An HPS lamp after turning off. The alumina material glows red because it is still hot.

A sodium-vapor lamp is a gas-discharge lamp that uses sodium in an excited state to produce light at a characteristic wavelength near 589 nm.

Two varieties of such lamps exist: low pressure and high pressure. Low-pressure sodium lamps are highly efficient electrical light sources, but their yellow-orange light restricts applications to outdoor lighting, such as street lamps, where they are widely used. High-pressure sodium lamps emit a broader spectrum of light than the low-pressure lamps, but they still have poorer color rendering than other types of lamps. Low-pressure sodium lamps give only monochromatic yellow-orange light, inhibiting color vision at night.

Single ended self-starting lamps are insulated with a mica disc and contained in a borosilicate glass gas discharge tube (arc tube) with a metal cap. They include the sodium-vapor lamp that is the gas-discharge lamp used in street lighting.

Low-pressure sodium lamps typically use a BY22d bayonet base, while High-pressure sodium lamps often use the E27 (for smaller wattages 35–100 W) and E40 (for higher wattages 150–1000 W) Edison screw lamp base. Like all gas-discharge lamps, sodium vapour lamps require an electrical ballast in order to operate.

== Development ==
The low-pressure sodium arc discharge lamp was first made practical around 1920 owing to the development of a type of glass that could resist the corrosive effects of sodium vapor. These operated at pressures of less than 1 Pa and produced a near monochromatic light spectrum around the sodium emission lines at 589.0 and 589.6 nanometres wavelength. The yellow light produced by these limited the range of applications to those where color vision was not required.

Research into high-pressure sodium lamps occurred in both the United Kingdom and the United States. Increasing the pressure of the sodium vapor broadened the sodium emission spectrum so that the light produced had more energy emitted at wavelengths above and below the 589 nm region. The quartz material used in mercury discharge lamps was corroded by high pressure sodium vapor. A laboratory demonstration of a high pressure lamp was carried out in 1959. The development by General Electric of a sintered aluminum oxide material (with magnesium oxide added to improve light transmission) was an important step in construction of a commercial lamp. The material was available in the form of tubing by 1962, but additional techniques were required to seal the tubes and add the necessary electrodes—the material could not be fused like quartz. The end caps of the arc tube would get as hot as 800 °C (1,470 °F) in operation, then cool to room temperature when the lamp was turned off, so the electrode terminations and arc tube seal had to tolerate repeated temperature cycles. This problem was solved by Michael Arendash at the GE Nela Park plant. The first commercial high-pressure sodium lamps were available in 1965 from companies in the United States, the United Kingdom, and the Netherlands; at introduction a 400 watt lamp would produce around 100 lumens per watt.

Single-crystal artificial sapphire tubes were also manufactured and used for HPS lamps in the early 1970s, with a slight improvement in efficacy, but production costs were higher than for polycrystalline alumina tubes.

== Low-pressure sodium ==
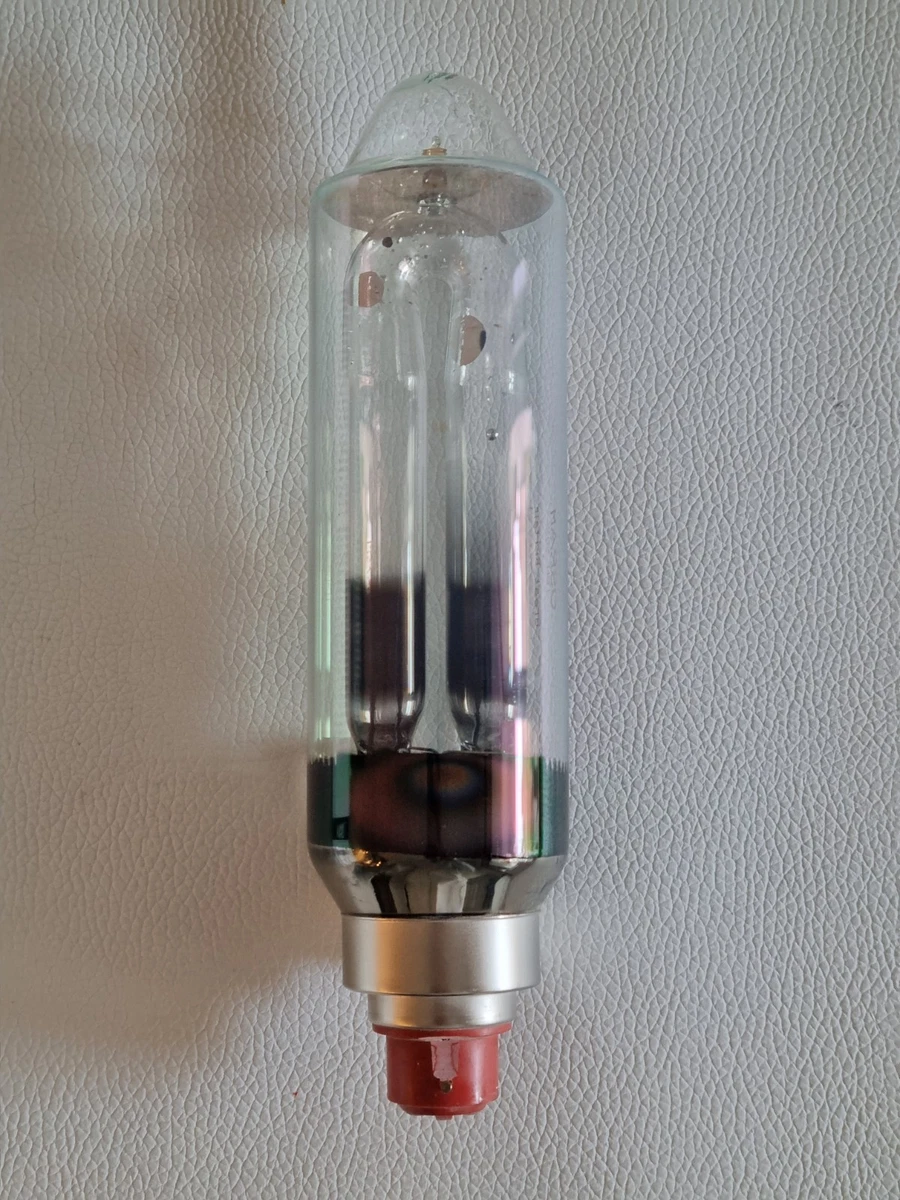
Low-pressure sodium lamp (SOX)

Spectrum of a low-pressure sodium lamp. The intense yellow band is the atomic sodium D-line emission, comprising about 90% of the visible light emission for this lamp type.

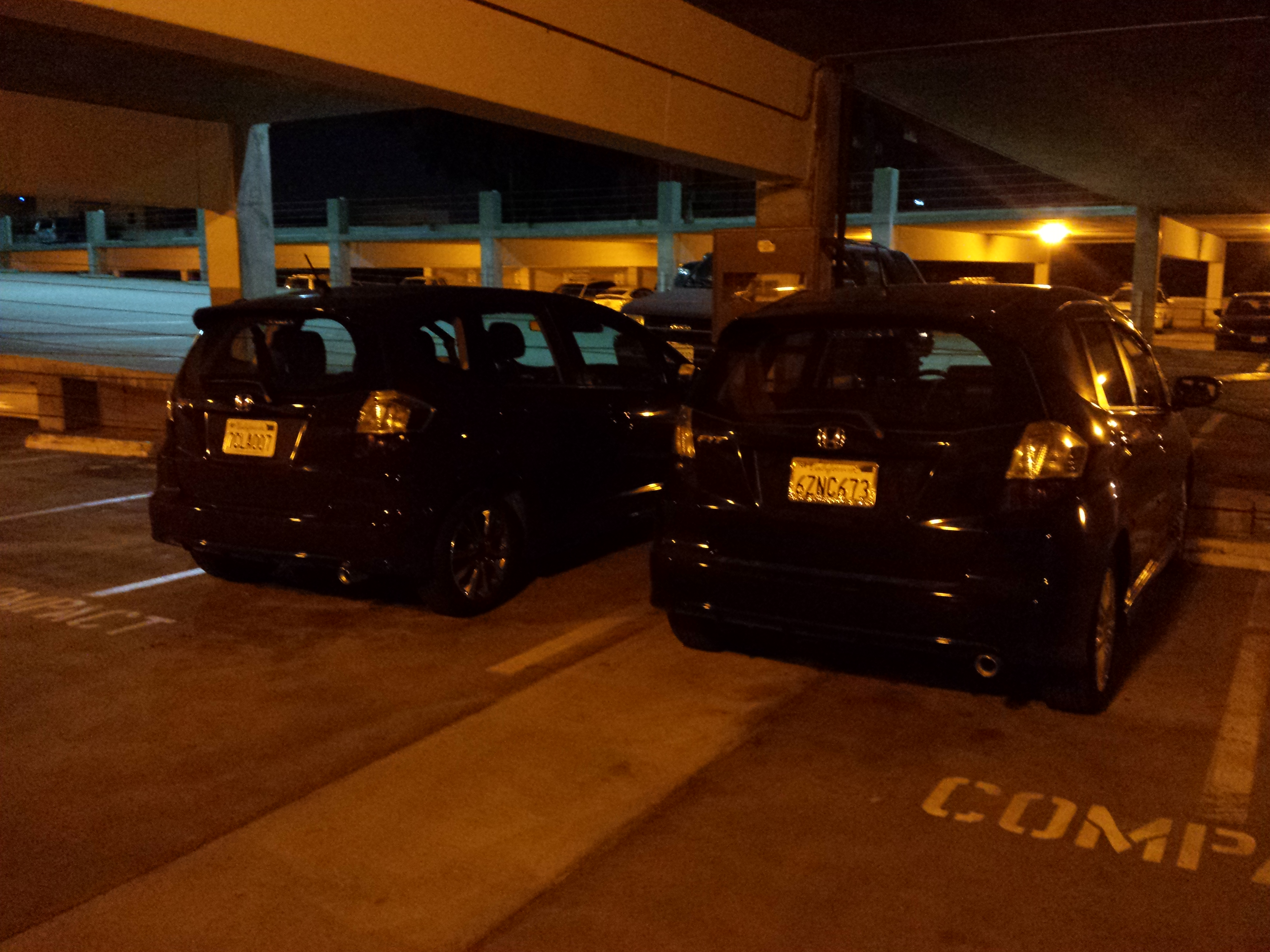
Two Honda Fits under low-pressure sodium lamps. Both appear black, even though the car on the left is bright red, while the car on the right is actually black.

Low-pressure sodium (LPS) lamps have a borosilicate glass gas discharge tube containing solid sodium and a small amount of neon and argon gas in a Penning mixture (99% neon, 1% argon) to start the gas discharge. The discharge tube may be linear (SLI lamp) or U-shaped. When the lamp is first started, it emits a dim red/pink light (from the neon and argon) to warm the sodium metal; within a few minutes as the sodium metal vaporizes, the emission becomes the common bright yellow. These lamps produce a virtually monochromatic light averaging a 589.3 nm wavelength (actually two dominant spectral lines very close together at 589.0 and 589.6 nm). The colors of objects illuminated by only this narrow bandwidth are difficult to distinguish.

LPS lamps have an outer glass vacuum envelope around the inner discharge tube for thermal insulation, which improves their efficiency. Earlier LPS lamps had a detachable dewar jacket (SO lamps). Lamps with a permanent vacuum envelope (SOI lamps) were developed to improve thermal insulation. Further improvement was attained by coating the glass envelope with an infrared reflecting layer of indium tin oxide, resulting in SOX lamps, the current, standard type of Low pressure sodium lamps.

Following the development of the Philips Mini-SOX 18W (which became the smallest size of Low pressure sodium lamps and later incorporated into the SOX-E range), some of the design features that contributed to its high efficacy were applied to the existing high power SOX lamps. The result was the SOX-E (Economy) range, that was more energy-efficient and operated on less current than before. They are easily distinguished by their black bayonet caps instead of red on standard SOX lamps. Lamp power was significantly reduced compared to that of the traditional SOX range, lowering discharge current density and increasing luminous efficacy. This was achieved through improved thermal insulation and a modified infrared-reflective coating.

Another later development was the SOX-PSG (Philips Solid-state Getter) lamp by Philips, which introduced a drastically different getter (meant to maintain a perfect vacuum) system to prevent leaks that could cause early failures in standard SOX lamps and thus intended to have a more reliable and long-lasting life for the end user. They also employed a refined thermal design for greater efficacy and durability. Some (mainly early-mid production) examples are usually identified by their blue bayonet caps, though later examples retained the normal red ones. SOX-PSG lamps were produced only in the 35 W and 55 W ratings, with the 36 W SOX-E being the only energy efficient/Economy model adapted into a SOX-E-PSG variant that has a green bayonet cap. SOX-Plus/Pro lamps are also known to have been made available that were intended to have double the overall lifespan that of regular SOX/low-pressure sodium lamps but look extremely similar to regular lamps.

LPS lamps are among the most efficient electrical light sources when measured in photopic lighting conditions, producing above 100 and up to 206 lm/W. This high efficiency is partly due to the light emitted being at a wavelength near the peak sensitivity of the human eye. They are used mainly for outdoor lighting (such as street lights and security lighting) where faithful color rendition is not important.

LPS lamps are similar to fluorescent lamps in that they are a low-intensity light source with a linear lamp shape. They do not exhibit a bright arc as do high-intensity discharge (HID) lamps; they emit a softer luminous glow, resulting in less glare. Unlike HID lamps, during a voltage dip low-pressure sodium lamps return to full brightness rapidly. LPS lamps are available with power ratings from 10 to 180 W; longer lamp lengths can, however, suffer design and engineering problems.

Modern LPS lamps have a service life of about 18,000 hours and do not decline in lumen output with age, though they do increase in energy consumption by about 10% towards end of life. This property contrasts with mercury vapor HID lamps, which become dimmer towards the end of life to the point of being ineffective, while consuming undiminished electrical power.

In 2017 Philips Lighting, a major manufacturer of LPS lamps, announced they were discontinuing production of the lamps due to falling demand. Initially, production was due to be phased out in the course of 2020, but this date was brought forward and the last lamps were produced at the Hamilton, Scotland factory on December 31, 2019.

=== Light-pollution considerations ===
For locations where light pollution is a consideration, such as near astronomical observatories or sea turtle nesting beaches, low-pressure sodium is preferred (as formerly in San Jose, California and Flagstaff, Arizona). Such lamps emit light on just two dominant spectral lines (with other much weaker lines), and therefore have the least spectral interference with astronomical observation. Now that production of LPS lamps has ceased, consideration is being given into the use of narrow-band amber LEDs, which are on a similar color spectrum to LPS.

The yellow color of low-pressure sodium lamps leads to the least visual sky glow, due primarily to the Purkinje shift of dark-adapted human vision, causing the eye to be relatively insensitive to the yellow light scattered at low luminance levels in the clear atmosphere. One consequence of widespread public lighting is that on cloudy nights, cities with enough lighting are illuminated by light reflected off the clouds. Where sodium vapor lights are the source of urban illumination, the night sky is tinged with orange.

=== Film special effects ===
Sodium vapor process (occasionally referred to as yellowscreen) is a film technique that relies on narrowband characteristics of LPS lamp. Color negative film typically is insensitive to the yellow light of an LPS lamp, but special black-and-white film is able to record it. Using a special camera, scenes are recorded on two spools simultaneously: one with actors (or other foreground objects), and another that becomes a mask for later combination with a different background. This technique originally yielded results superior to blue-screen technology, and was used in years 1956 to 1990, mostly by Disney Studios. Notable examples of films using this technique include Alfred Hitchcock's The Birds and the Disney films Mary Poppins and Bedknobs and Broomsticks. Later advancements in blue and green-screen techniques and computer imagery closed that gap, leaving SVP economically impractical.

=== Electrical parameters ===
Lamp type	Rated power (W)	Lamp power (W)	Nominal lamp voltage (V)	Lamp current (A)
SOX-E	18	18	57	0.35
SOX-E	26	27	69	0.45
SOX-E	36	35	120	0.35
SOX-E	66	65	123	0.62
SOX-E	91	90	173	0.62
SOX-E	131	127	250	0.62
SOX	35	37	70	0.60
SOX	55	56	109	0.59
SOX	90	91	112	0.94
SOX	135	135	164	0.95
SOX	180	185	240	0.91

== High-pressure sodium ==
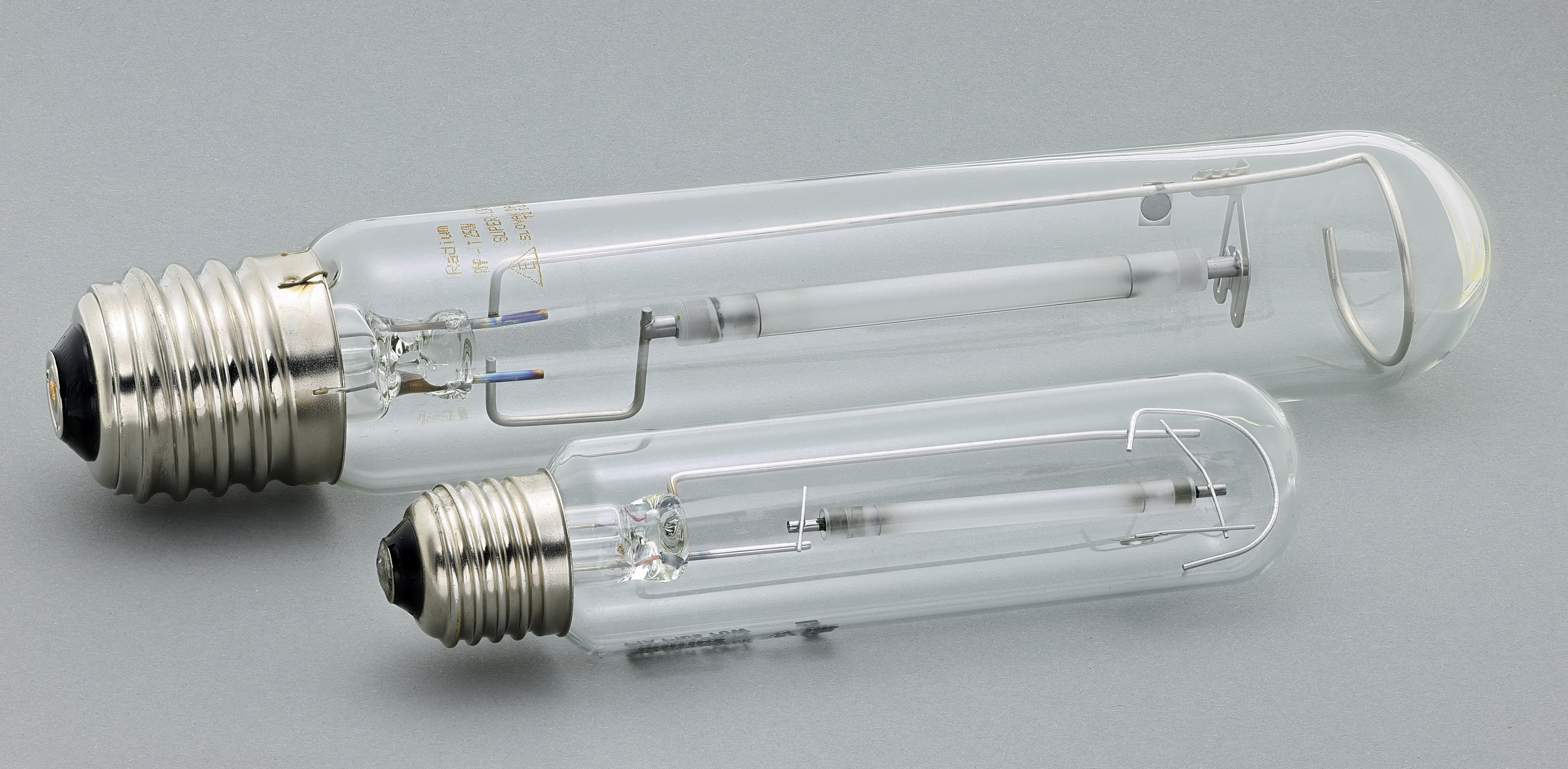
High-pressure sodium lamps (SON)

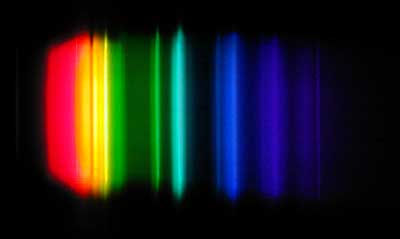
Spectrum of high-pressure sodium lamp. The yellow-red band on the left is the atomic sodium D-line emission; the turquoise line is a sodium line that is otherwise quite weak in a low pressure discharge, but becomes intense in a high-pressure discharge. Most of the other green, blue, and violet lines arise from mostly sodium but also mercury lines.

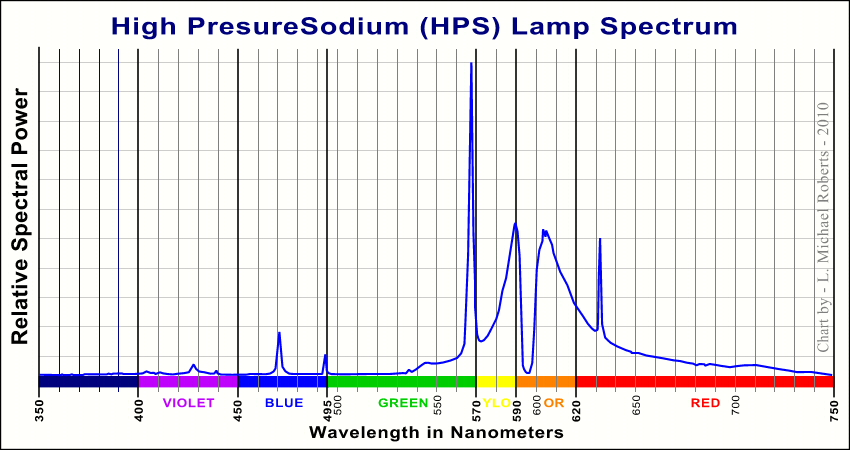
Diagram showing the spectral output of a typical high-pressure sodium (HPS) lamp

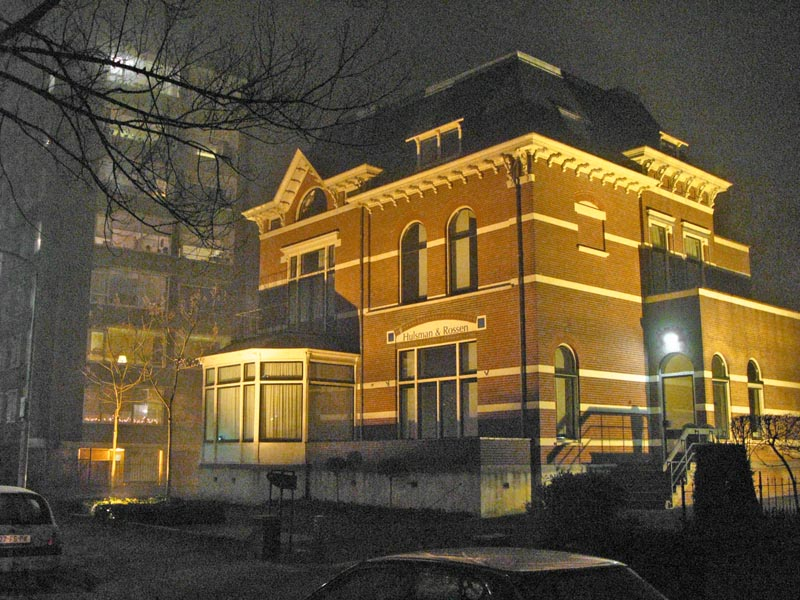
Office building illuminated by high-pressure sodium lamps

High-pressure sodium (HPS) lamps have been widely used in industrial lighting, especially in large manufacturing facilities, and are commonly used as plant grow lights. They contain mercury. They have also been widely used for outdoor area lighting, such as on roadways, parking lots, and security areas. Understanding the change in human color vision sensitivity from photopic to mesopic and scotopic is essential for proper planning when designing lighting for roadways.

High-pressure sodium lamps are quite efficient—about 100 lumens per watt, when measured for photopic lighting conditions. Some higher-power lamps (e.g. 600 watt) have efficacies of about 150 lumens per watt.

Since the high-pressure sodium arc is extremely chemically reactive, the arc tube is typically made of translucent aluminum oxide. This construction led the General Electric Company to use the tradename "Lucalox" for its line of high-pressure sodium lamps.

Xenon at a low pressure is used as a "starter gas" in the HPS lamp. It has the lowest thermal conductivity and lowest ionization potential of all the stable noble gases. As a noble gas, it does not interfere with the chemical reactions occurring in the operating lamp. The low thermal conductivity minimizes thermal losses in the lamp while in the operating state, and the low ionization potential causes the breakdown voltage of the gas to be relatively low in the cold state, which allows the lamp to be easily started.

=== "White" high-pressure sodium lamp ===
A variation of the high-pressure sodium introduced in 1986, the white HPS lamp has a still higher pressure than the typical HPS lamp, producing a color temperature of around 2500 kelvins with a color rendering index (CRI) of about 85, greatly resembling the color of an incandescent light. These lamps are often used indoors in cafes and restaurants for aesthetic effect. However, white HPS lamps have higher cost, and lower lumen efficacy, and so they cannot compete with HPS.

==== Electrical parameters of white sodium lamps ====
Rated power (W)	Lamp power (W)	Nominal lamp voltage (V)	Lamp current (A)
35	33.3	98	0.47
50	55.5	90	0.78
100	97	98	1.31

=== Theory of operation ===
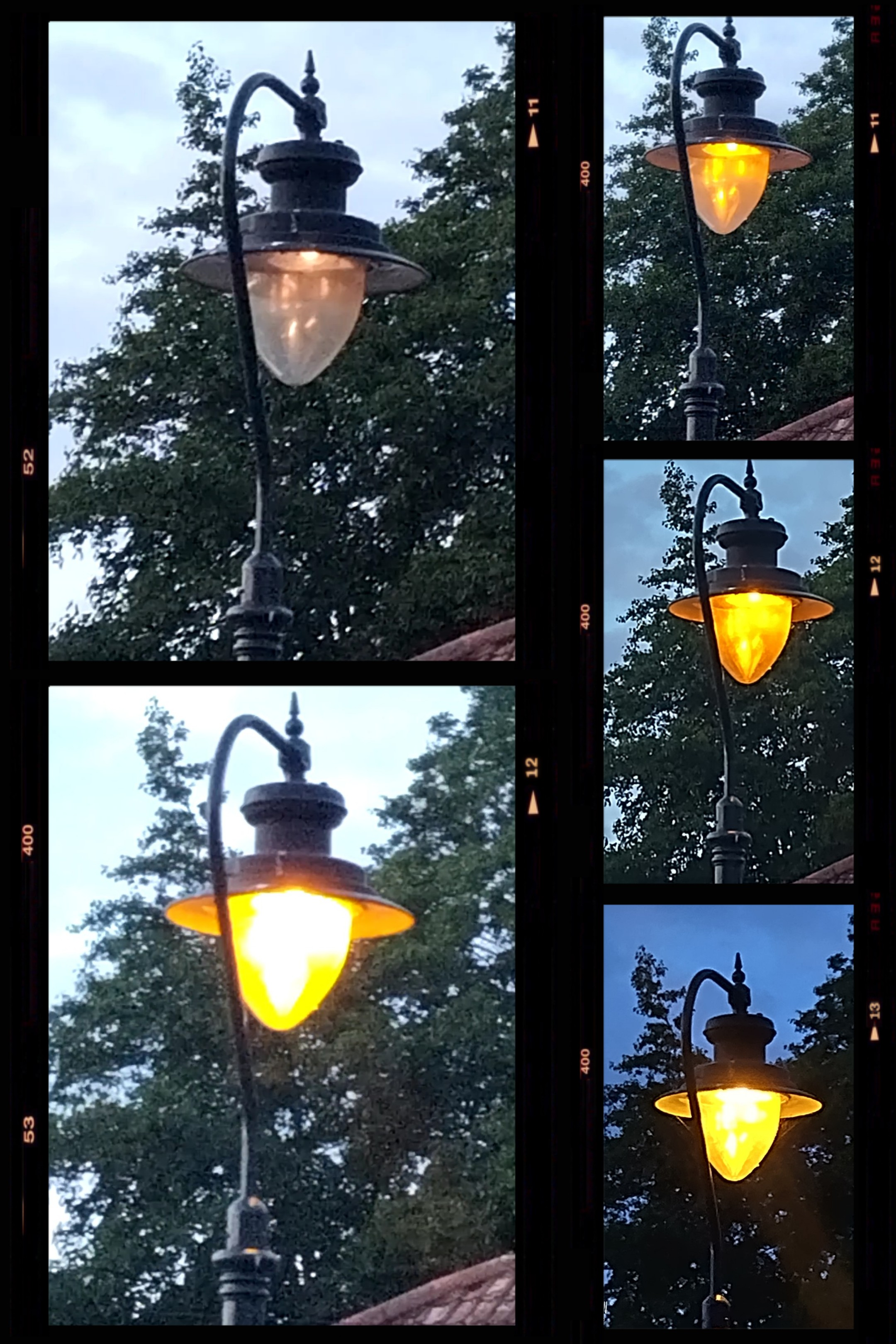
Warm-up phases of a 70W HPS/SON lamp on a DW Windsor Strand B fitting. The faint white glow of xenon from the arc struck in the arc tube is quickly and gradually replaced by the orange glow of the metallic sodium vapour.

Diagram of a high-pressure sodium lamp

An amalgam of metallic sodium and mercury lies at the coolest part of the lamp and provides the sodium and mercury vapor that is needed to draw an arc. The temperature of the amalgam is determined to a great extent by lamp power. The higher the lamp power, the higher will be the amalgam temperature. The higher the temperature of the amalgam, the higher will be the mercury and sodium vapor pressures in the lamp and the higher will be the terminal voltage. As the temperature rises, the constant current and increasing voltage consumes increasing energy until the operating level of power is reached. For a given voltage, there are generally three modes of operation:

1. The lamp is extinguished and no current flows.
2. The lamp is operating with liquid amalgam in the tube (saturated vapor).
3. The lamp is operating with all amalgam evaporated (unsaturated vapor).

The first and last states are stable, because the lamp resistance is weakly related to the voltage, but the second state is unstable. Any anomalous increase in current will cause an increase in power, causing an increase in amalgam temperature, which will cause a decrease in resistance, which will cause a further increase in current. This will create a runaway effect, and the lamp will jump to the high-current state (#3). Because actual lamps are not designed to handle this much power, this would result in catastrophic failure. Similarly, an anomalous drop in current will drive the lamp to extinction. It is the second state that is the desired operating state of the lamp, because a slow loss of the amalgam from a reservoir, as the lamp burns over time, will have less effect on the characteristics of the lamp than a fully evaporated amalgam. The result is an average lamp life in excess of 20,000 hours.

In practical use, the lamp is powered by an AC voltage source in series with an inductive ballast in order to supply a nearly constant current to the lamp, rather than a constant voltage, thus assuring stable operation. The ballast is usually inductive rather than simply being resistive to minimize energy waste from resistance losses. Because the lamp effectively extinguishes at each zero-current point in the AC cycle, the inductive ballast assists in the reignition by providing a voltage spike at the zero-current point.

The light from the lamp consists of atomic emission lines of mercury and sodium, but is dominated by the sodium D-line emission. This line is extremely pressure (resonance) broadened and is also self-reversed because of absorption in the cooler outer layers of the arc, giving the lamp its improved color rendering characteristics. In addition, the red wing of the D-line emission is further pressure broadened by the Van der Waals forces from the mercury atoms in the arc.

=== Electrical parameters for European and British high-pressure sodium lamps ===
Lamp type	Rated power (W)	Lamp power (W)	Nominal lamp voltage (V)	Lamp current (A)
SON	35	35	85V±15	0.53
SON	50	50	85V±15	0.76
SON	70	70	90V±15	0.98
SON	100	100	100±15	1.20
SON	150	150	100±15	1.80
SON	250	250	100±15	3.00
SON	400	392	100±15	4.60
SON	600	605	110±15	6.10
SON-T	1000	960	100±15	10.60
SON-E	1000	1000	110±15	10.60

=== Electrical parameters for American high-pressure sodium lamps ===
Lamp type	Rated power (W)	Lamp power (W)	Nominal lamp voltage (V)	Lamp current (A)
S76	35	35	52	0.83
S68	50	50	52	1.18
S62	70	70	52	1.60
S54	100	100.4	55	2.10
S55	150	150	55	3.20
S56	150	150	100	1.80
S66	200	200	100	2.40
S50	250	250	100	3.00
S67	310	310	100	3.60
S51	400	400	100	4.60
S145	430	430	116	4.25
S106	600	600	110	6.20
S111	750	750	120	7.00
S52	1000	1000	250	4.70

== End of life ==
At the end of life, saturated high-pressure sodium (HPS) lamps may begin cycling on and off. Material sputtered off the electrodes darkens the arc tube, so it absorbs more radiated light and operates hotter. Increased temperature causes increased gas pressure, which increases arc tube voltage drop. Eventually the electrical ballast no longer provides sufficient voltage to maintain an arc discharge. As the lamp heats, the arc fails, and the lamp goes out. With the arc extinguished, the lamp cools down again, the gas pressure in the arc tube is reduced, and the electrical ballast can once again cause the arc to strike. The effect of this is that the lamp glows for a while and then goes out, typically starting at a pure or bluish white and then moving to a red-orange before going out. Some ignitor designs give up attempting to start the lamp after a few cycles to protect ballast and ignitor from deterioration due to multiple high voltage pulses. If power is removed and reapplied, the ballast will make a new series of startup attempts.

Unsaturated high-pressure sodium lamps exhibit a different failure at the end of life. Since all the sodium-amalgam is vaporized, there is no voltage rise, so these lamps don't cycle at their end of life. When all the sodium is consumed, the lamp operates with a greenish color of the mercury vapor discharge.

LPS lamp failure does not result in cycling. The lamp will not strike or will maintain the dull red glow of the start-up phase. In another failure mode, a tiny puncture of the arc tube leaks some of the sodium vapor into the outer vacuum bulb. The sodium condenses and creates a mirror on the outer glass, partially obscuring the arc tube. The lamp often continues operating normally, but much of the light generated is obscured by the sodium coating, providing no illumination.

== Decline and gradual phase out to LED ==
Since the mid 2010s, many city authorities around the world have begun to phase out the sodium vapor lamp by switching to light-emitting diode (LED) street lighting, citing environmental concerns (especially over climate change) and savings on energy consumption (since LEDs are significantly more efficient in comparison). However these lamps are typically manufactured to emit white light in the 4500-5000K range (compared to 1400-2700K for Sodium). These have various health concerns and aesthetic dislike amongst people in addition to technical malfunctions. Some municipalities, such as Titusville, Florida, and the neighboring Kennedy Space Center, have installed amber LED streetlights to preserve the warmer hue of their high-pressure sodium predecessors.

== Gallery ==
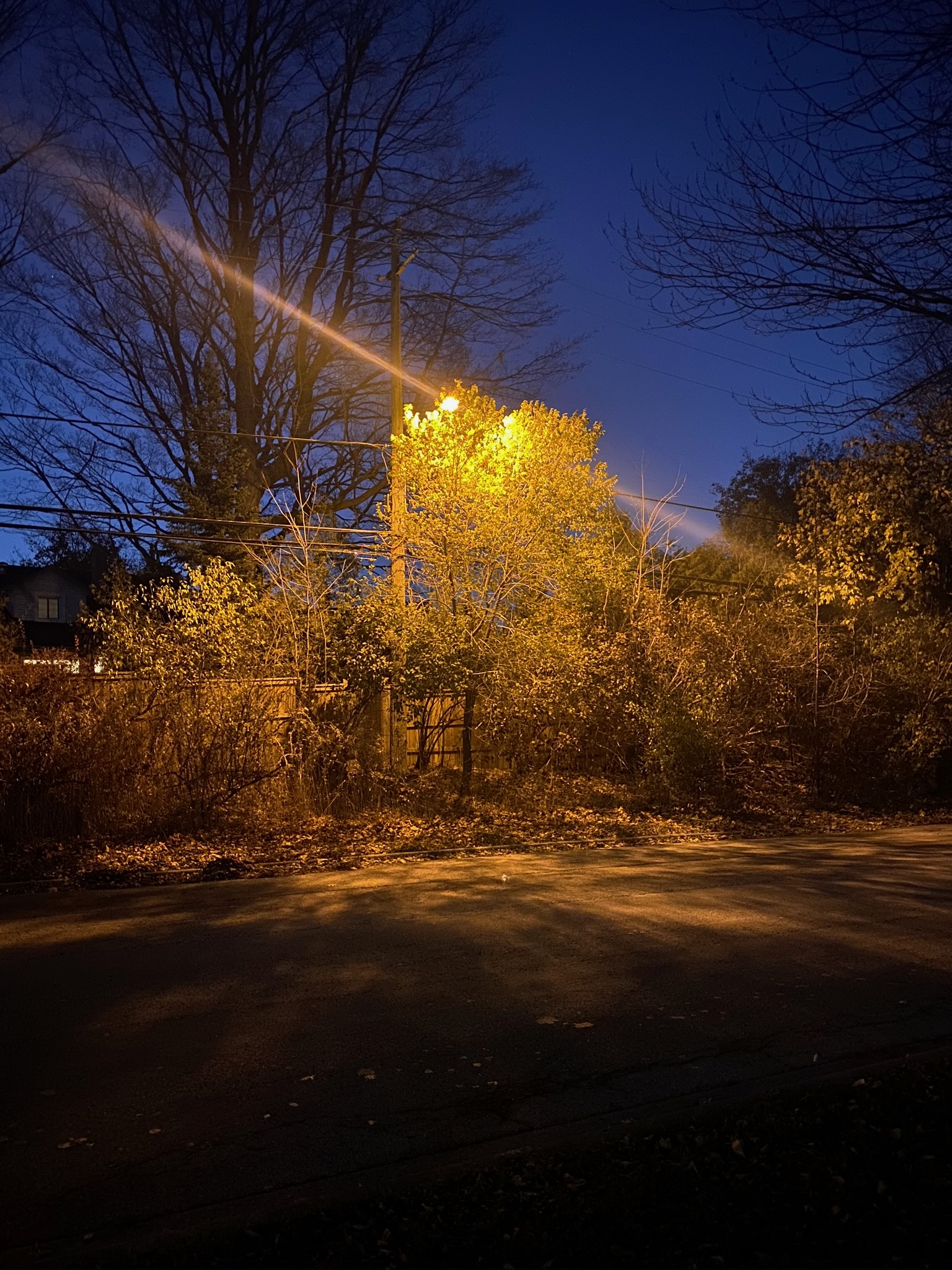
A high-pressure sodium street light in Toronto

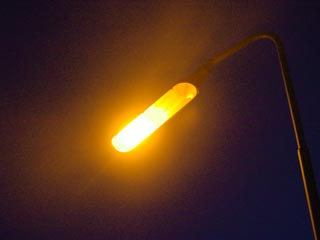
A low-pressure sodium street light running at full brightness

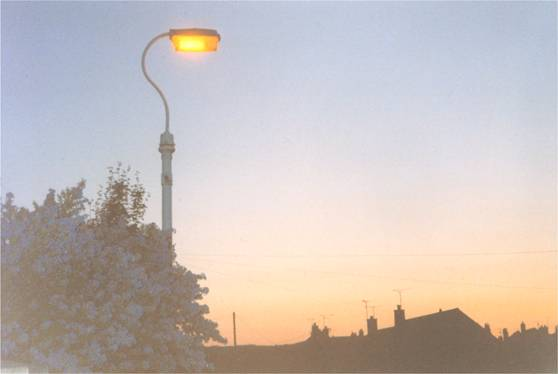
A low-pressure sodium/SOX street light in Wrexham, Wales

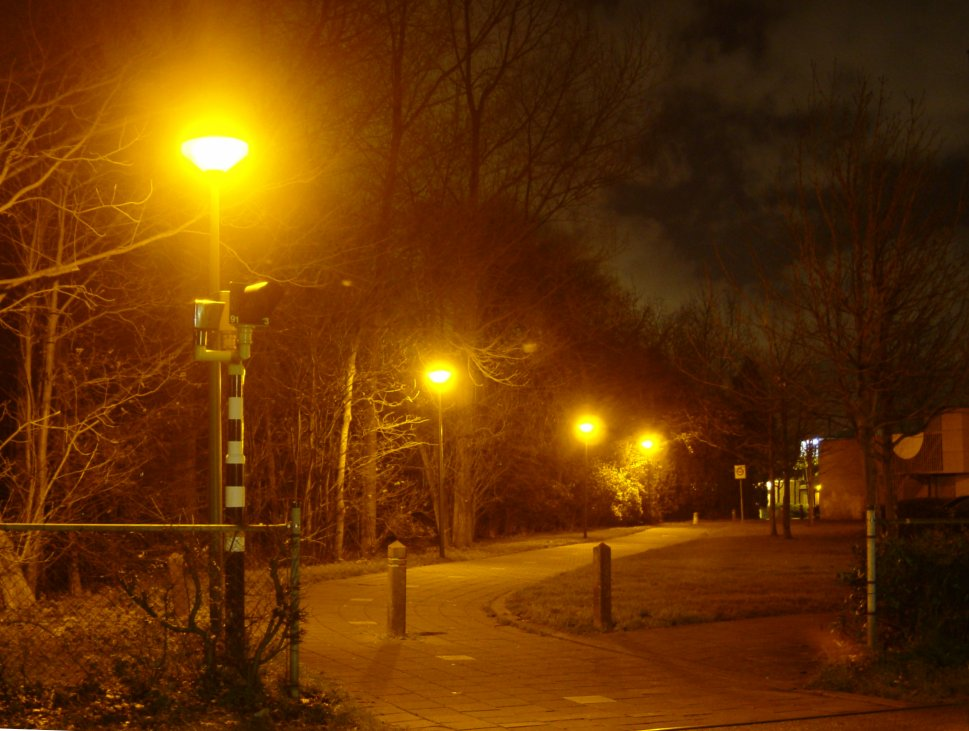
Low-pressue sodium/SOX street lights in Schiedam, South Holland, Netherlands

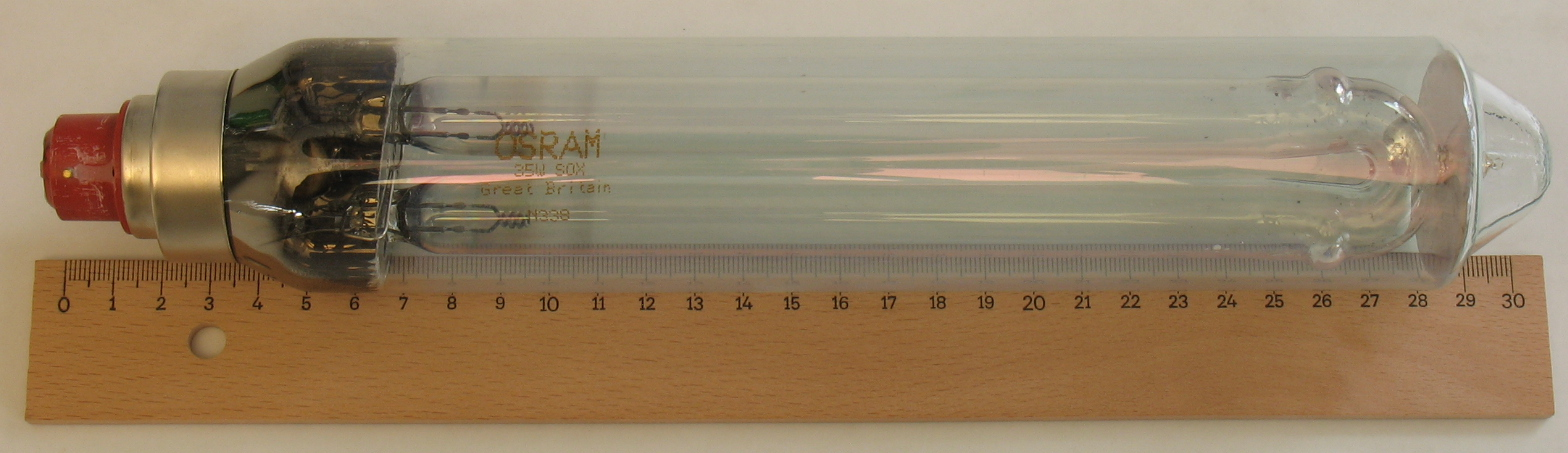
An unlit Osram 35 W LPS/SOX lamp

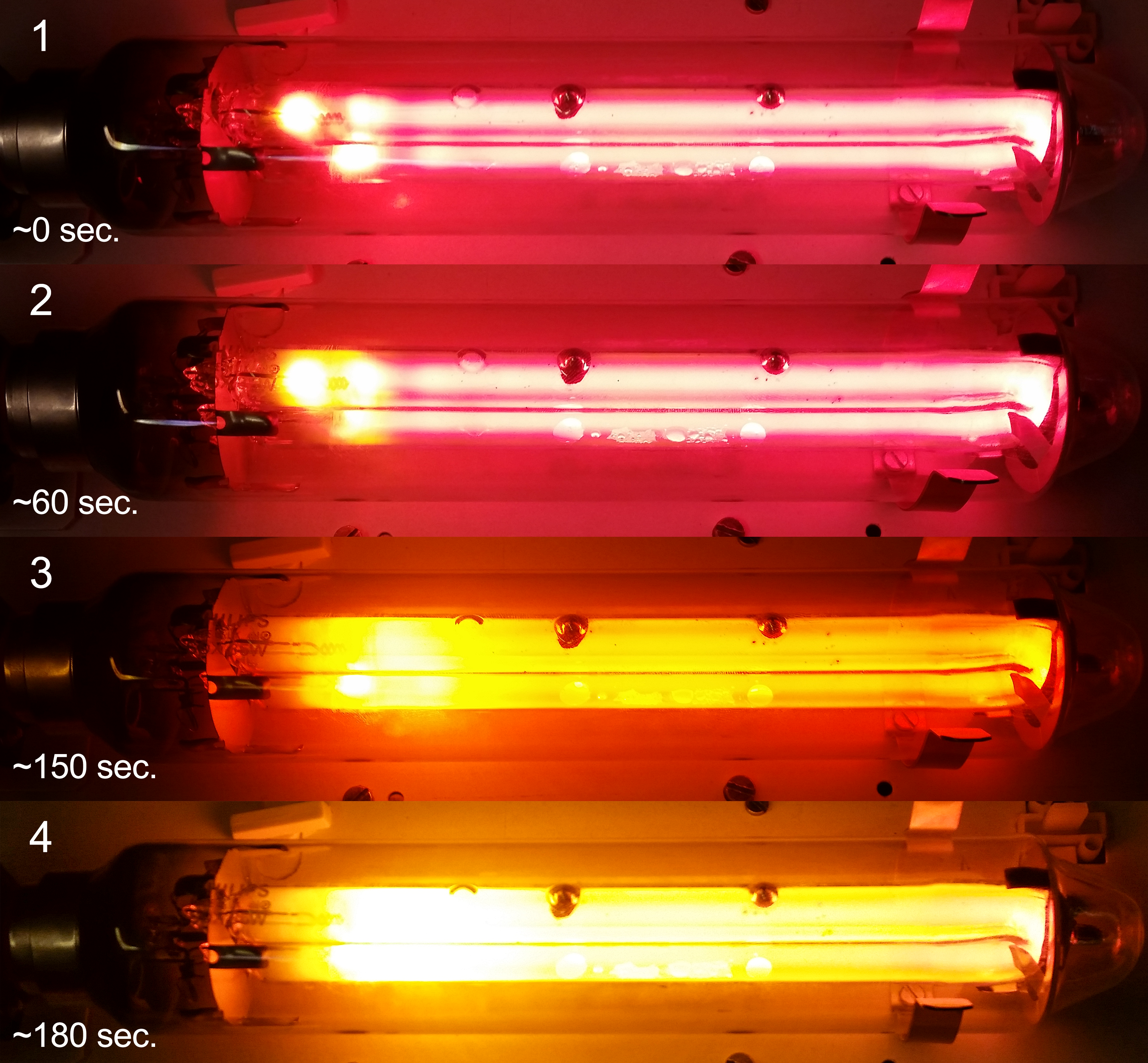
An LPS/SOX lamp warming up

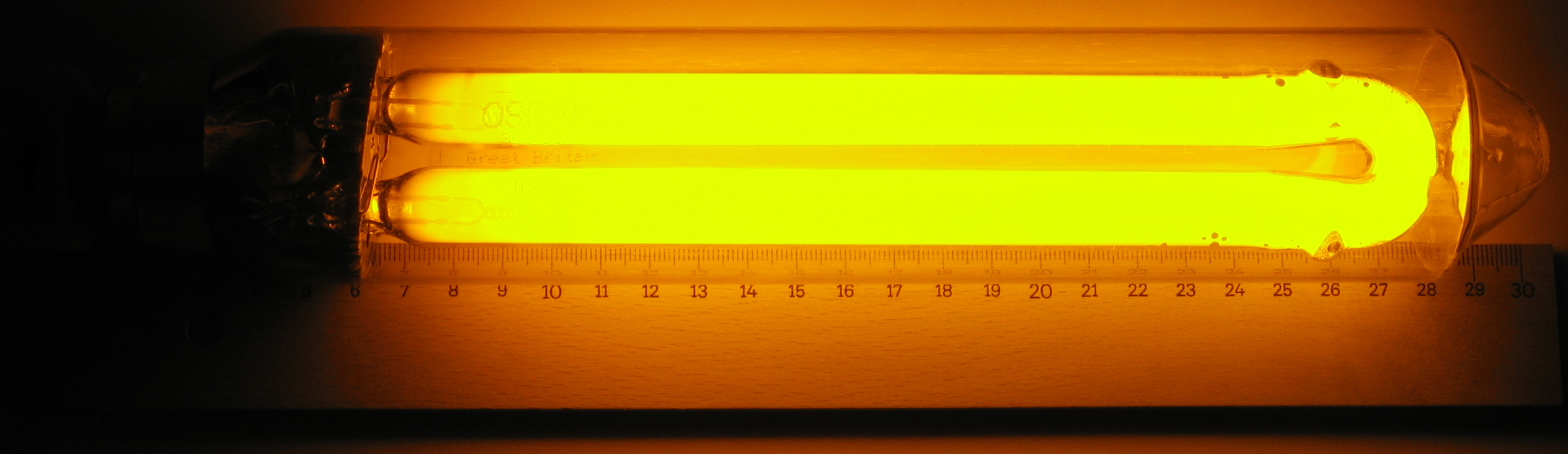
A running 35 W LPS/SOX lamp at full brightness

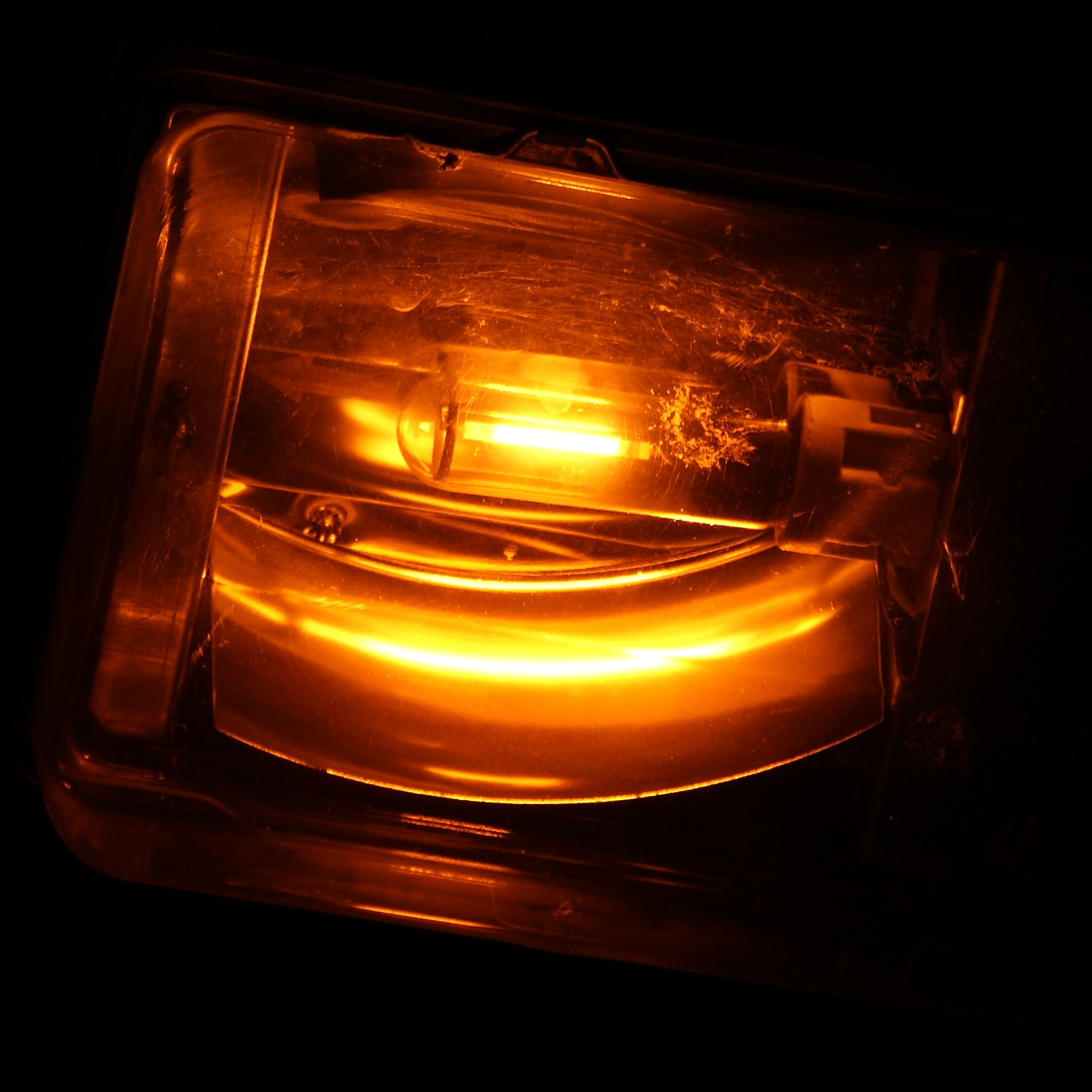
A high-pressure sodium-vapor lamp

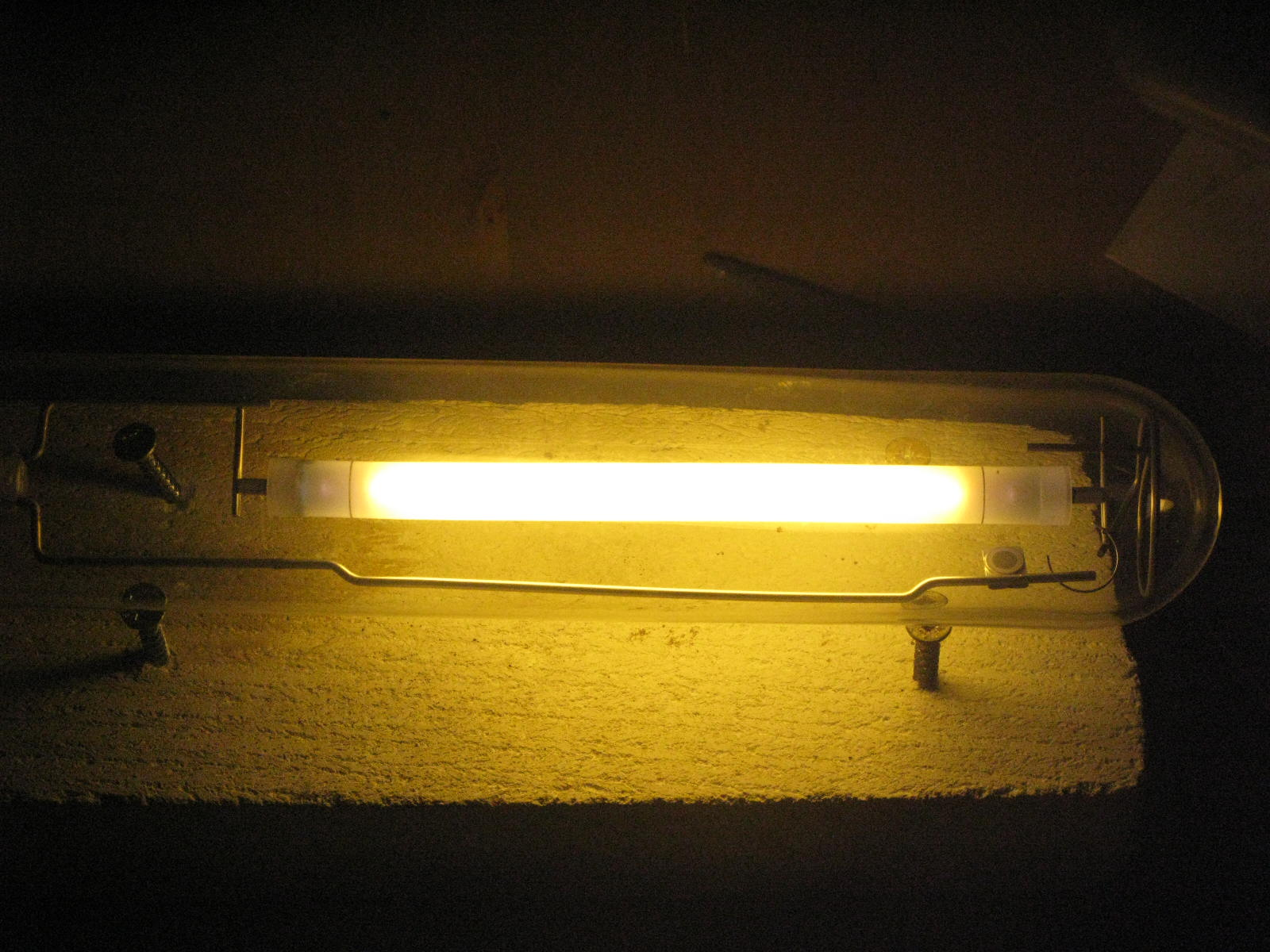
High-pressure sodium lamp in operation

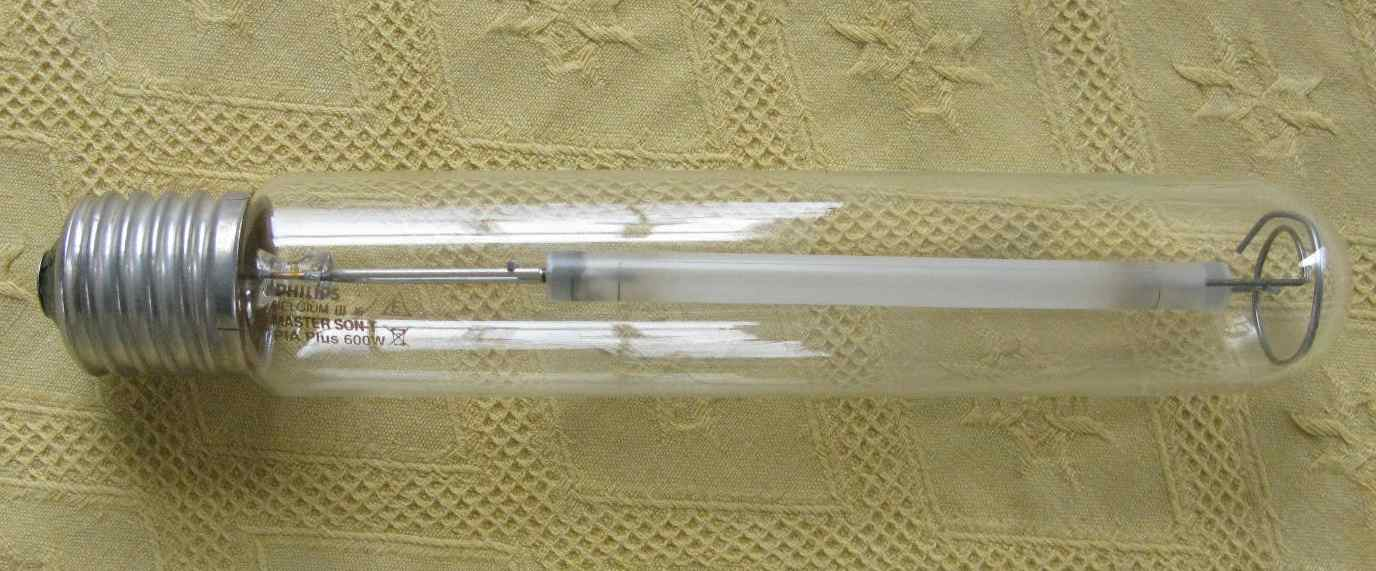
High-pressure sodium lamp Philips SON-T Master 600 W

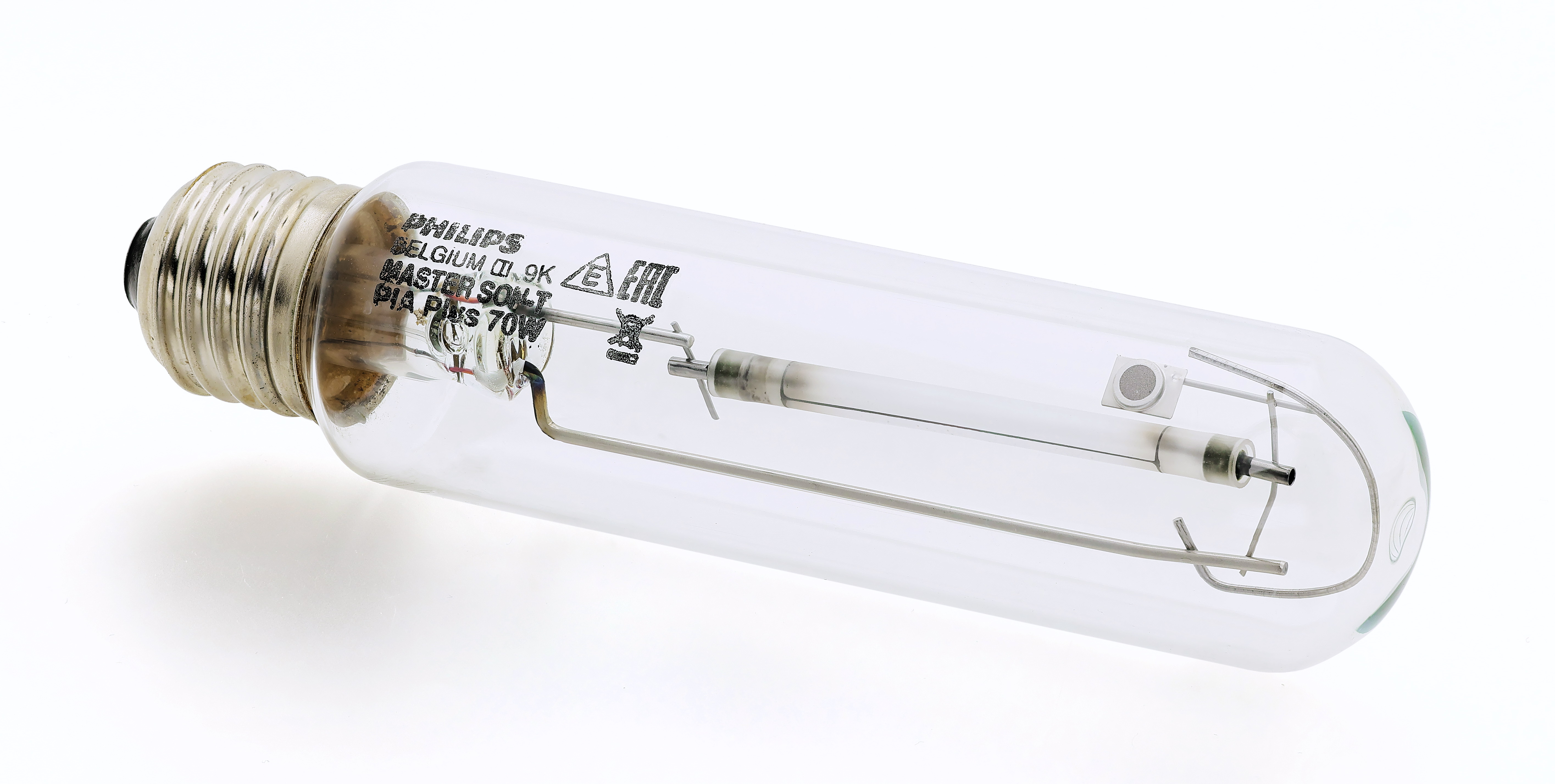
High-pressure sodium lamp Philips SON-T Master 70 W

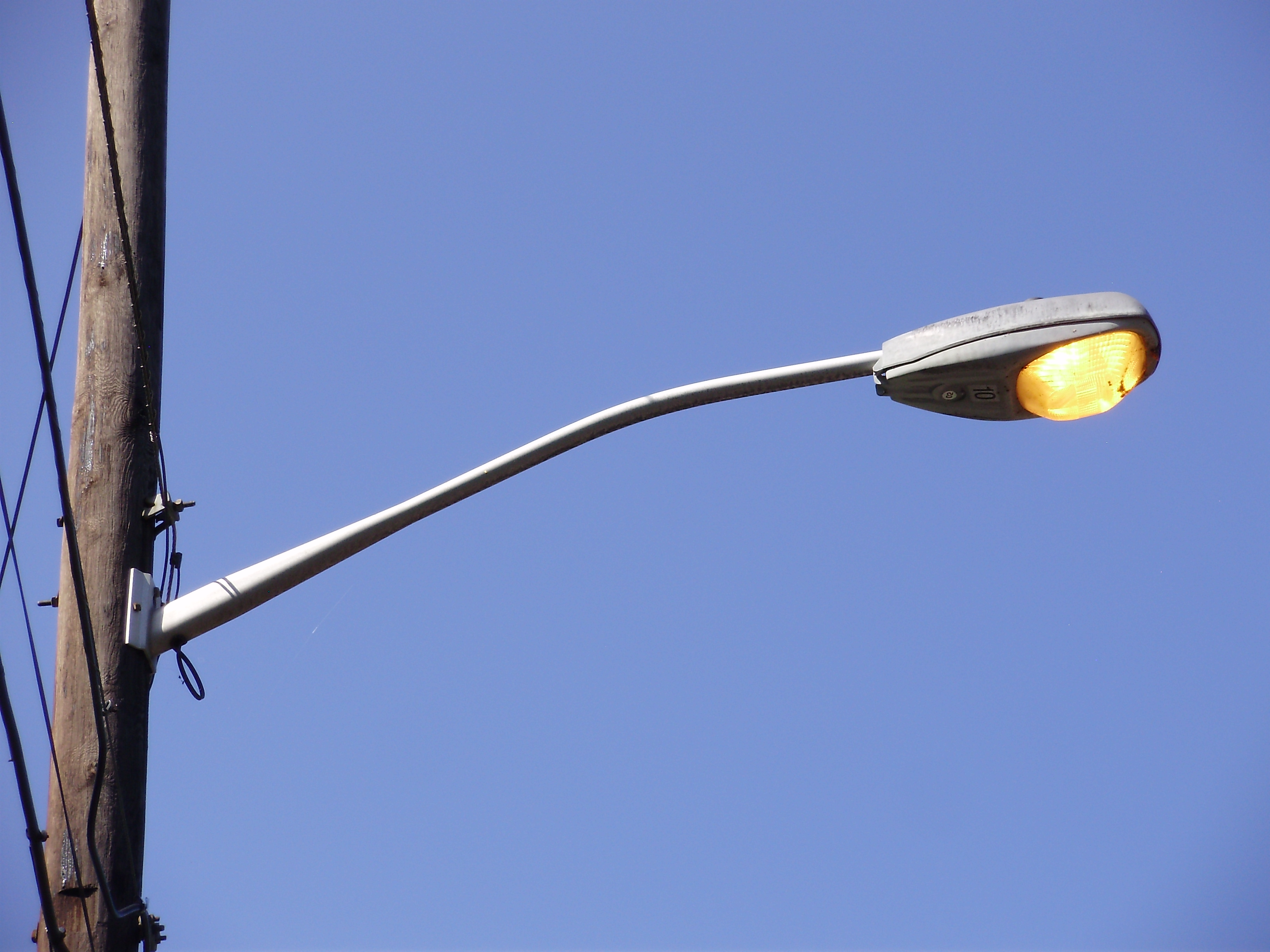
Sodium vapor street light

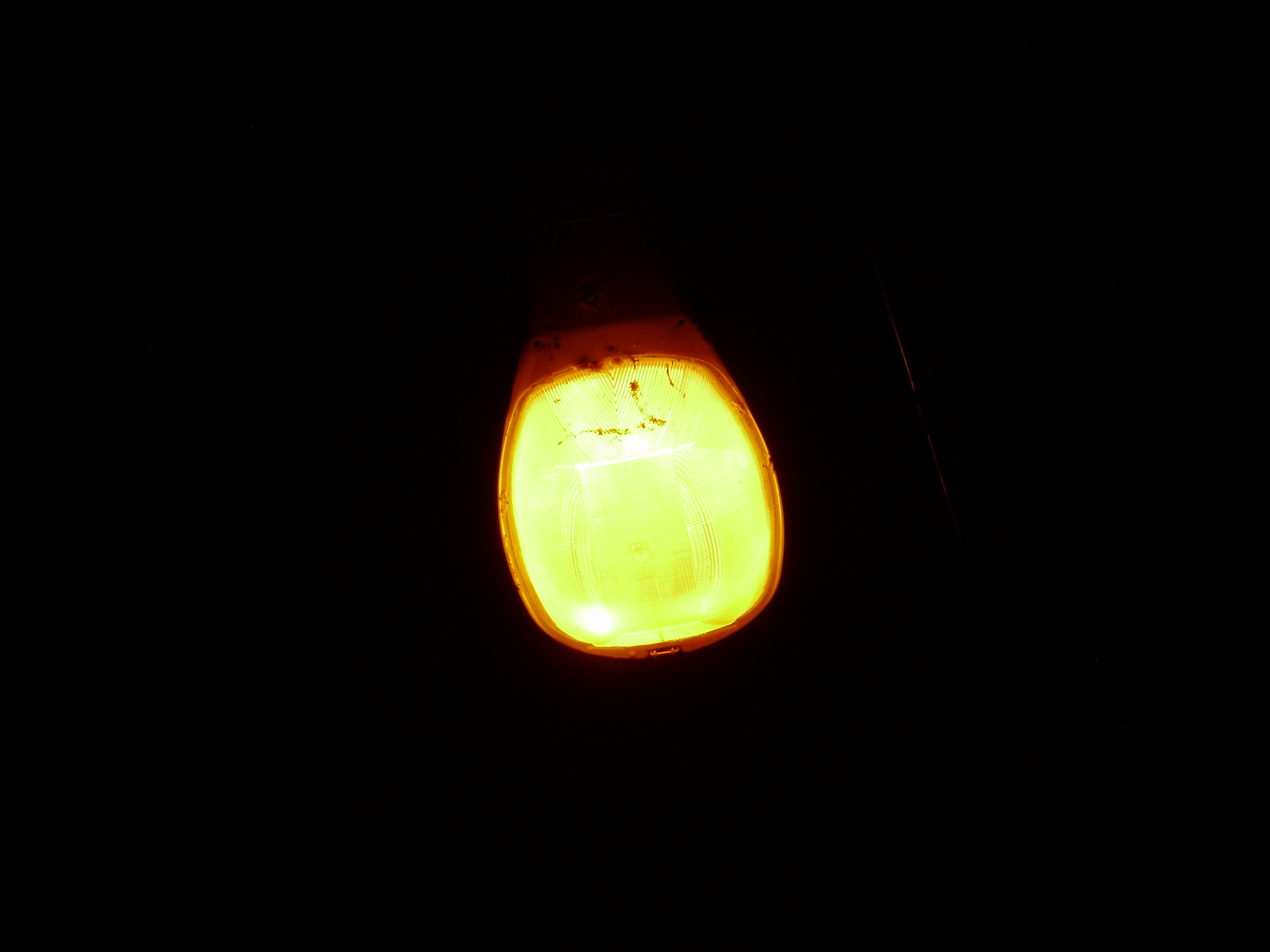
Closeup after dark

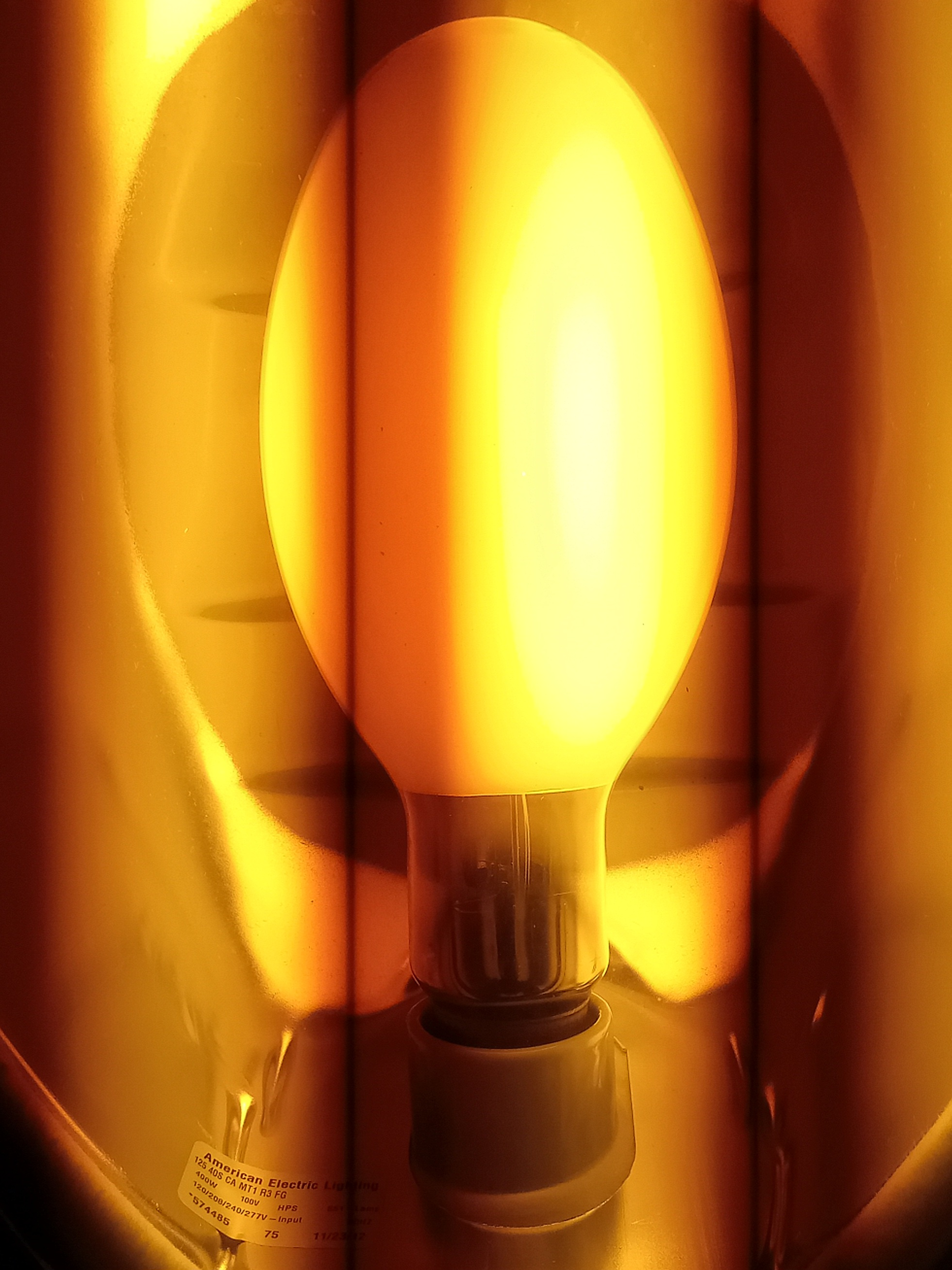
GE Lucalox 400-watt high-pressure sodium lamp warming up.

== See also ==
- Arc lamp – Lamp that produces light by an electric arc
- High-intensity discharge lamp – Type of electric lamp/bulb (HID)
- History of street lighting in the United States
- Light pollution – Excess artificial light in an environment
- List of light sources – Devices and processes that produce light
- Mercury-vapor lamp – Light source using an electric arc through mercury vapor
- Metal-halide lamp – Type of lamp
- Neon lamp – Light source based on gas discharge
- Street light – Raised source of light beside a road or path
- Sulfur lamp – Lighting system
