= Gas-discharge lamp =

Artificial light sources powered by ionized gas electric discharge

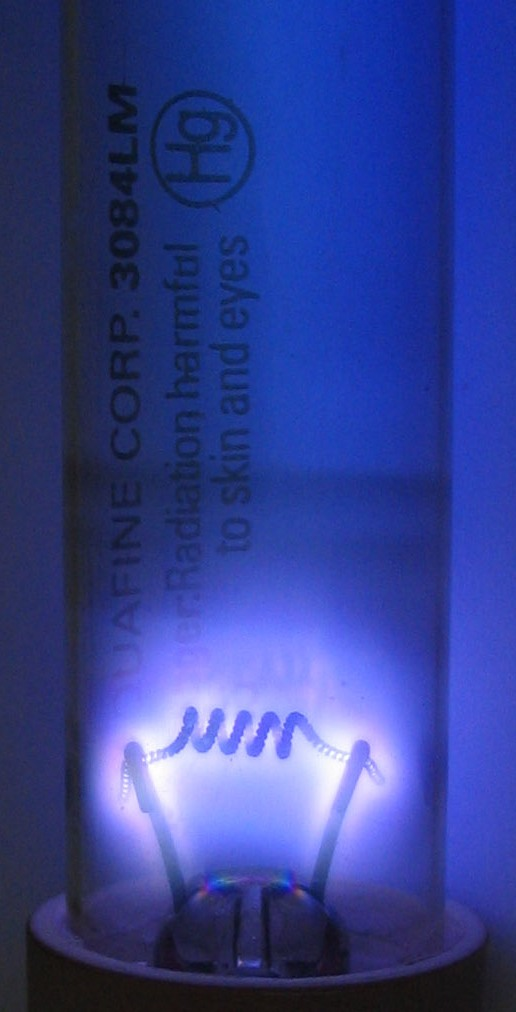
Germicidal lamps are simple low-pressure mercury vapor discharges in a fused quartz envelope.

Gas-discharge lamps are a family of artificial light sources that generate light by sending an electric discharge through an ionized gas, a plasma.

Typically, such lamps use a noble gas (argon, neon, krypton, and xenon) or a mixture of these gases. Some include additional substances, such as mercury, sodium, and metal halides, which are vaporized during start-up to become part of the gas mixture.

Single-ended self-starting lamps are insulated with a mica disc and contained in a borosilicate glass gas discharge tube (arc tube) and a metal cap. They include the sodium-vapor lamp that is used in gas-discharge lamps in some street lighting.

In operation, some of the electrons are forced to leave the atoms of the gas near the anode by the electric field applied between the two electrodes, leaving these atoms positively ionized. The free electrons thus released flow to the anode, while the cations thus formed are accelerated by the electric field and flow towards the cathode.

The ions typically cover only a very short distance before colliding with neutral gas atoms, which give the ions their electrons. The atoms which lost an electron during the collisions ionize and speed toward the cathode while the ions which gained an electron during the collisions return to a lower energy state, releasing energy in the form of photons. Light of a characteristic frequency is thus emitted. In this way, electrons are relayed through the gas from the cathode to the anode.

The color of the light produced depends on the emission spectra of the atoms making up the gas, as well as the pressure of the gas, current density, and other variables. Gas discharge lamps can produce a wide range of colors. Some lamps produce ultraviolet radiation which is converted to visible light by a fluorescent coating on the inside of the lamp's glass surface. The fluorescent lamp is perhaps the best known gas-discharge lamp.

Compared to incandescent lamps, gas-discharge lamps offer higher efficiency, but are more complicated to manufacture and most exhibit negative resistance, causing the resistance in the plasma to decrease as the current flow increases. Therefore, they usually require auxiliary electronic equipment such as ballasts to control current flow through the gas, preventing current runaway (arc flash).

Some gas-discharge lamps also have a perceivable start-up time to achieve their full light output. Still, owing to their greater efficiency, gas-discharge lamps were preferred over incandescent lights in many lighting applications, until recent improvements in LED lamp technology.

== History ==
The history of gas-discharge lamps began in 1675 when the French astronomer Jean Picard observed that the empty space in his mercury barometer glowed as the mercury jiggled while he was carrying the barometer. Investigators, including Francis Hauksbee, tried to determine the cause of the phenomenon. Hauksbee first demonstrated a gas-discharge lamp in 1705. He showed that an evacuated or partially evacuated glass globe, in which he placed a small amount of mercury, while charged by static electricity could produce a light bright enough to read by. The phenomenon of electric arc was first described by Vasily V. Petrov in 1802. In 1809, Sir Humphry Davy demonstrated the electric arc at the Royal Institution of Great Britain. Since then, discharge light sources have been researched because they create light from electricity considerably more efficiently than incandescent light bulbs.

The father of the low-pressure gas discharge tube was German glassblower Heinrich Geissler, who beginning in 1857 constructed colorful artistic cold cathode tubes with different gases in them which glowed with many different colors, called Geissler tubes. It was found that inert gases such as the noble gases neon, argon, krypton or xenon, as well as carbon dioxide worked well in tubes. This technology was commercialized by the French engineer Georges Claude in 1910 and became neon lighting, used in neon signs.

The introduction of the metal vapor lamp, including various metals within the discharge tube, was a later advance. The heat of the gas discharge vaporizes some of the metal and the discharge is then produced almost exclusively by the metal vapor. The usual metals are sodium and mercury owing to their visible spectrum emission.

One hundred years of research later led to lamps without electrodes which are instead energized by microwave or radio-frequency sources. In addition, light sources of much lower output have been created, extending the applications of discharge lighting to home or indoor use.

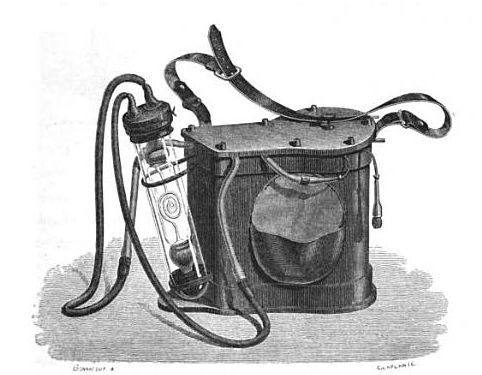
Jules Verne's "Ruhmkorff lamp"

=== The "Ruhmkorff" lamp ===
Ruhmkorff lamps were an early form of portable electric lamp, named after Heinrich Daniel Ruhmkorff and first used in the 1860s. The lamp consisted of a Geissler tube that was excited by a battery-powered Ruhmkorff induction coil; an early transformer capable of converting DC currents of low voltage into rapid high-voltage pulses. Initially the lamp generated white light by using a Geissler tube filled with carbon dioxide. However, the carbon dioxide tended to break down. Hence in later lamps, the Geissler tube was filled with nitrogen (which generated red light), and the clear glass was replaced with uranium glass (which fluoresced with a green light).

Intended for use in the potentially explosive environment of mining, as well as oxygen-free environments like diving or for a heatless lamp for possible use in surgery, the lamp was actually developed both by Alphonse Dumas, an engineer at the iron mines of Saint-Priest and of Lac, near Privas, in the department of Ardèche, France, and by Dr Camille Benoît, a medical doctor in Privas. In 1864, the French Academy of Sciences awarded Dumas and Benoît a prize of 1,000 francs for their invention. The lamps, cutting-edge technology in their time, gained fame after being described in several of Jules Verne's science-fiction novels.

== Color ==
Each gas, depending on its atomic structure emits radiation of certain wavelengths, its emission spectrum, which determines the color of the light from the lamp. As a way of evaluating the ability of a light source to reproduce the colors of various objects being lit by the source, the International Commission on Illumination (CIE) introduced the color rendering index (CRI). Some gas-discharge lamps have a relatively low CRI, which means colors they illuminate appear substantially different from how they do under sunlight or other high-CRI illumination.

Gas	Color	Spectrum	Notes	Image
Helium	White to orange; under some conditions may be gray, blue, or green-blue.		Used by artists for special-purpose lighting.	
Neon	Red-orange		Intense light. Used frequently in neon signs and neon lamps.	
Argon	Violet to pale lavender blue		Often used together with mercury vapor.	
Krypton	Gray off-white to green. At high peak currents, bright blue-white.		Used by artists for special-purpose lighting.	
Xenon	Gray or blue-gray dim white. At high peak currents, very bright green-blue.		Used in flashlamp, xenon HID headlamps, and xenon arc lamps.	
Nitrogen	Similar to argon but duller, more pink; at high peak currents bright blue-white.		used in the Moore lamp (historically)	
Oxygen	Violet to lavender, dimmer than argon			
Hydrogen	Lavender at low currents, pink to magenta over 10 mA			
Water vapor	Similar to hydrogen, dimmer			
Carbon dioxide	Blue-white to pink, at lower currents brighter than xenon		Used in carbon dioxide laser, the Moore lamp (historically).	
Carbon Monoxide	Similar to carbon dioxide.			
Methane	Magenta, but more purple and pink.			
Chlorine	Lime or chartreuse.		used in the Halogen lamp (historically)	
Fluorine	Mustard or ivory.		used in the Halogen lamp (historically)	
Ammonia	Fuchsia, but more purple.			
Ozone	Indigo or navy, similar to oxygen			
Mercury vapor	Light blue, intense ultraviolet		Ultraviolet not shown on this spectral image. Used in combination with phosphors used to generate many colors of light. Widely used in mercury-vapor lamps and fluorescent tubes.	
Sodium vapor (low pressure)	Bright orange-yellow		Widely used in sodium-vapor lamps.	

== Types ==
Lamps are divided into families based on the pressure of gas, and whether or not the cathode is heated. Hot cathode lamps have electrodes that operate at a high temperature and are heated by the arc current in the lamp. The heat knocks electrons out of the electrodes by thermionic emission, which helps maintain the arc. In many types the electrodes consist of electrical filaments made of fine wire, which are heated by a separate current at startup, to get the arc started. Cold cathode lamps have electrodes that operate at room temperature. To start conduction in the lamp a high enough voltage (the striking voltage) must be applied to ionize the gas, so these lamps require higher voltage to start.

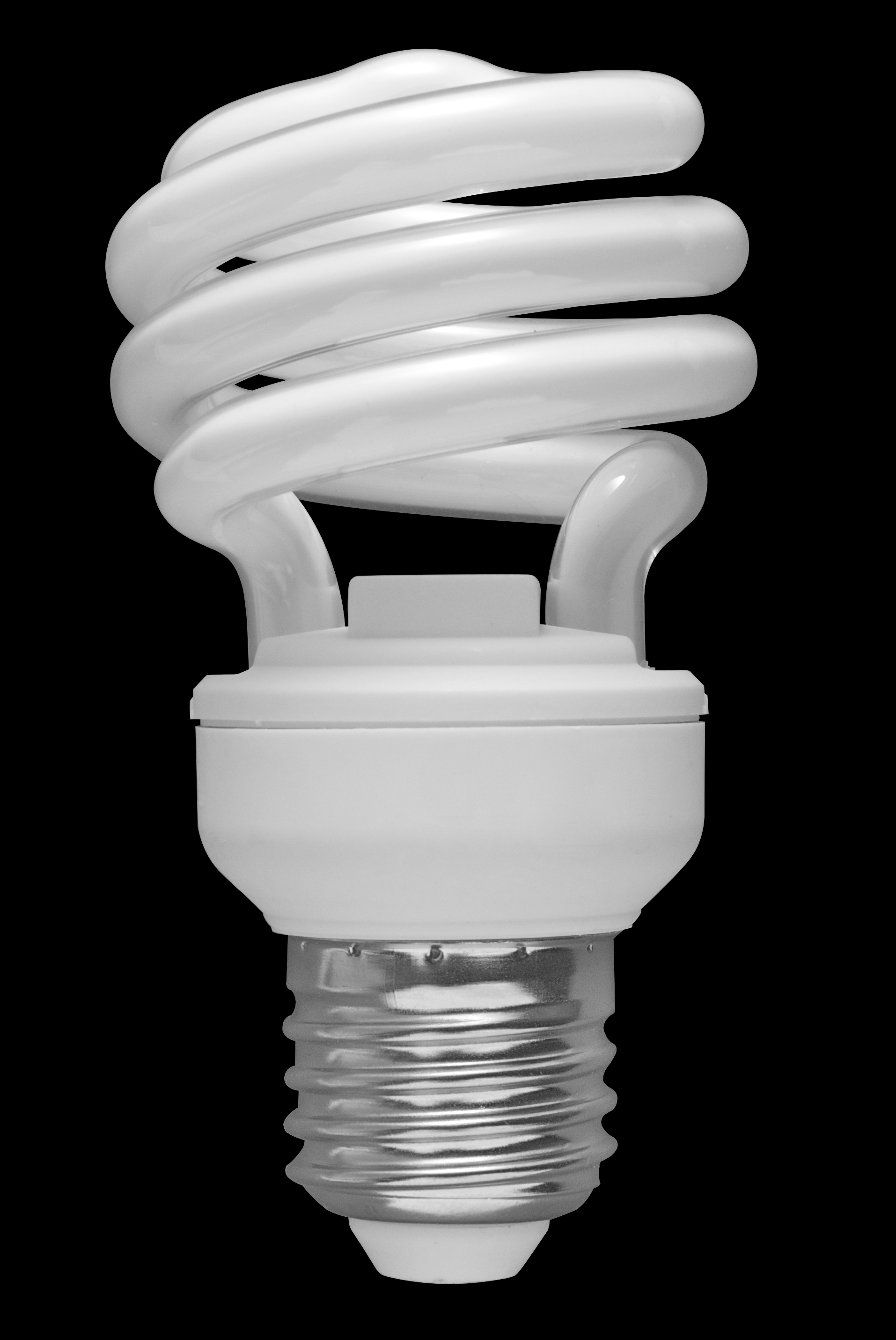
A compact fluorescent lamp

=== Low pressure discharge lamps ===
Low-pressure lamps have working pressure much less than atmospheric pressure. For example, common fluorescent lamps operate at a pressure of about 0.3% of atmospheric pressure.

Fluorescent lamps, a heated-cathode lamp, the most common lamp in office lighting and many other applications, produces up to 100 lumens per watt.

Neon lighting, a widely used form of cold-cathode specialty lighting consisting of long tubes filled with various gases at low pressure excited by high voltages, used as advertising in neon signs.

Low pressure sodium lamps, the most efficient gas-discharge lamp type, producing up to 200 lumens per watt, but at the expense of very poor color rendering. The almost monochromatic yellow light is only acceptable for street lighting and similar applications.

A small discharge lamp containing a bi-metallic switch is used to start a fluorescent lamp. In this case the heat of the discharge is used to actuate the switch; the starter is contained in an opaque enclosure and the small light output is not used.

Continuous glow lamps are produced for special applications where the electrodes may be cut in the shape of alphanumeric characters and figural shapes.

A flicker light bulb, flicker flame light bulb or flicker glow lamp is a gas-discharge lamp which produces light by ionizing a gas, usually neon mixed with helium and a small amount of nitrogen gas, by an electric current passing through two flame shaped electrode screens coated with partially decomposed barium azide. The ionized gas moves randomly between the two electrodes which produces a flickering effect, often marketed as suggestive of a candle flame (see image).

=== High pressure discharge lamps ===
High-pressure lamps have a discharge that takes place in gas under slightly less to greater than atmospheric pressure. For example, a high pressure sodium lamp has an arc tube under 100 to 200 torr pressure, about 14% to 28% of atmospheric pressure; some automotive HID headlamps have up to 50 bar or fifty times atmospheric pressure.

Metal halide lamps produce almost white light, and attain 100 lumen per watt light output. Applications include indoor lighting of high buildings, parking lots, shops, sport terrains.

High pressure sodium lamps, producing up to 150 lumens per watt produce a broader light spectrum than the low pressure sodium lamps. Also used for street lighting, and for artificial photoassimilation for growing plants.

High pressure mercury-vapor lamps are the oldest high pressure lamp type and have been replaced in most applications by metal halide and the high pressure sodium lamps. They require a shorter arc length.

=== High-intensity discharge lamps ===
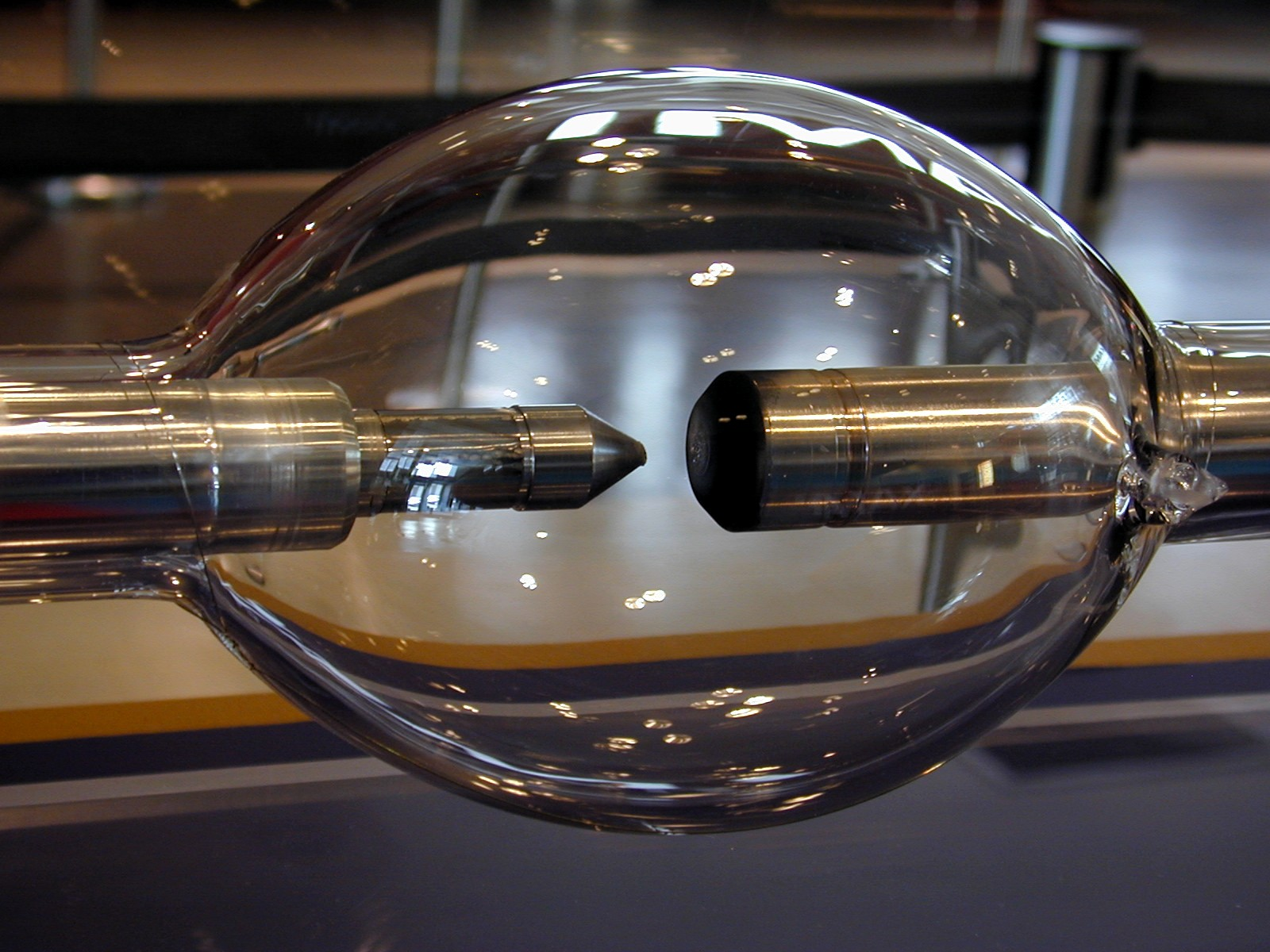
15 kW xenon short-arc lamp used in IMAX projectors

A high-intensity discharge (HID) lamp is a type of electrical lamp which produces light by means of an electric arc between tungsten electrodes housed inside a translucent or transparent fused quartz or fused alumina arc tube. Compared to other lamp types, its arc power is relatively high for the arc length.

HID lamps can be either low pressure or high pressure discharge lamp. Examples include mercury-vapor lamps, metal halide lamps, ceramic discharge metal halide lamps, sodium vapor lamps and xenon arc lamps.

HID lamps are typically used when high levels of light and energy efficiency are desired.

== Other examples ==
The Xenon flash lamp produces a single flash of light in the millisecond-microsecond range and is commonly used in film, photography and theatrical lighting. Particularly robust versions of this lamp, known as strobe lights, can produce long sequences of flashes, allowing for the stroboscopic examination of motion. This has found use in the study of mechanical motion, in medicine and in the lighting of dance halls.

== Alternatives ==
- Incandescent lamps: They have low manufacturing costs;
- White LED lamp. The efficiency of white LED lamps is 61-200 lm/W.
- Battery-powered lanterns (filling with krypton or xenon).

== See also ==
- Electric arc
- Electric glow discharge
- Emission spectrum
- Fluorescent lamp
- Gas-filled tube
- Hydrargyrum medium-arc iodide lamp
- List of light sources
- Light pollution
