= Lanthanum compounds =

Chemical compounds containing the element lanthanum

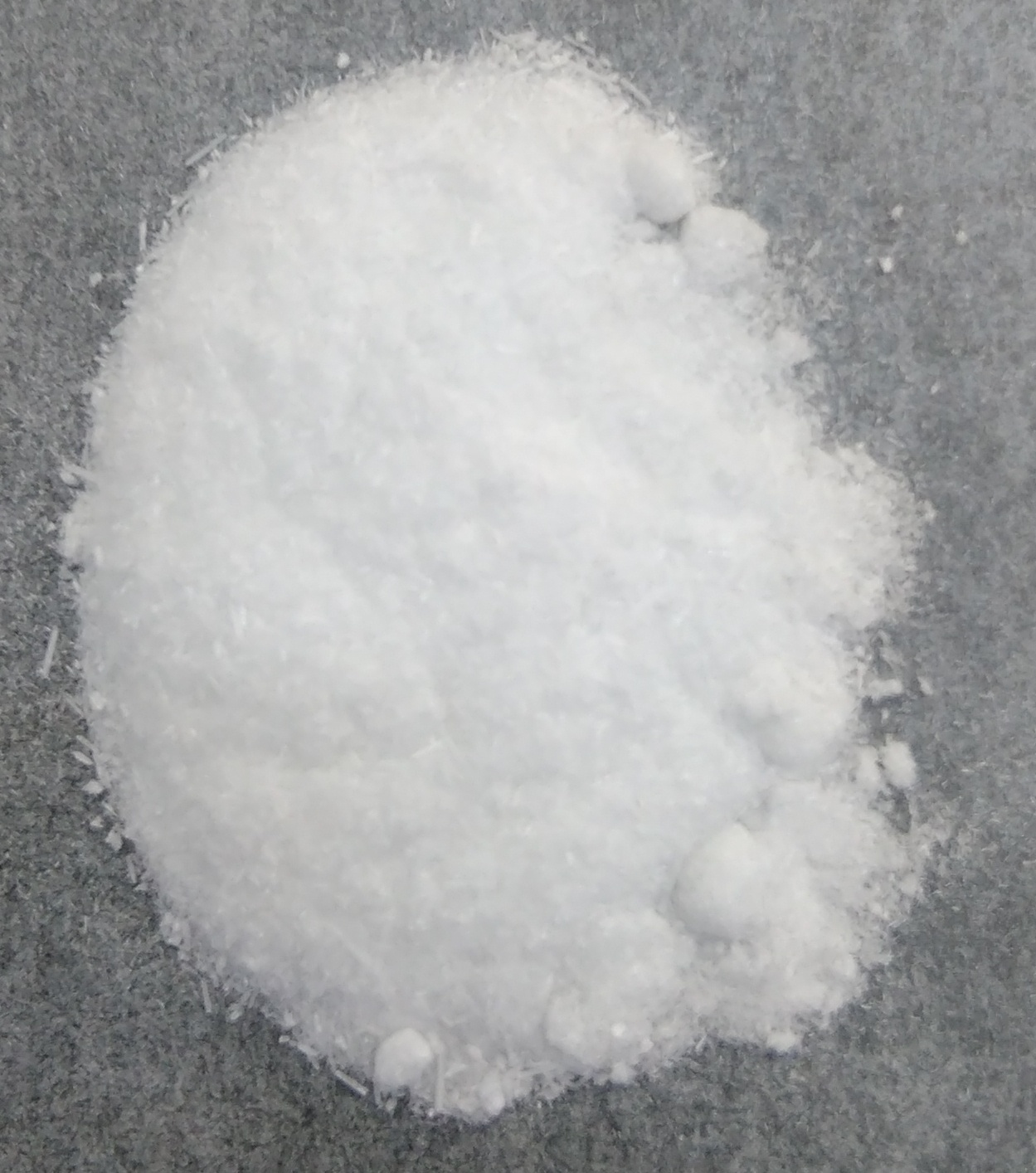
Lanthanum(III) acetate, a compound of lanthanum

Lanthanum compounds are compounds formed by the lanthanide metal lanthanum (La). Lanthanum occurs almost exclusively in the +3 oxidation state, and its compounds are generally strongly ionic because of the large size and electropositivity of the La^{3+} ion. This gives rise to extensive high-coordinate chemistry, particularly with hard donor atoms such as oxygen and halogens. Lanthanum forms numerous binary compounds, including oxides, halides, hydrides, chalcogenides, borides, carbides, silicides and pnictides, as well as a wide range of coordination, organometallic and intermetallic compounds.

Several lanthanum compounds have important physical or technological properties. Lanthanum hexaboride (LaB_{6}) is used as a low-work-function thermionic electron emitter, while lanthanum bromide doped with cerium is a high-performance scintillator for gamma-ray detection. The intermetallic compound LaNi_{5} and related alloys reversibly absorb hydrogen and are used in hydrogen-storage and nickel–metal hydride battery materials. Lanthanum(III) oxide is used or investigated in catalytic and high-k dielectric materials, lanthanum fluoride is a constituent of fluoride optical glasses, and lanthanum carbonate is used medically as a phosphate binder. At very high pressures, hydrogen-rich phases such as LaH_{10} form; LaH_{10} is a high-temperature superconductor with a transition temperature near 250 K under megabar pressures.

== Properties of lanthanum compounds ==
Selected crystallographic properties of lanthanum compounds are listed below. Lattice parameters refer to the reported crystalline modification and are given in nanometres.

Formula	Appearance	Crystal system	Space group	No.	a (nm)	b (nm)	c (nm)	Density (g/cm^{3})	Ref.
A-La_{2}O_{3}	White	Trigonal	P3̅m1	164	0.3937	—	0.6130	6.6	
LaF_{3}	White	Trigonal	P3̅c1	165	0.7185	—	0.7351	5.94	
LaCl_{3}	White	Hexagonal	P6_{3}/m	176	0.7478	—	0.4375	3.85	
LaBr_{3}	—	Hexagonal	P6_{3}/m	176	0.7970	—	0.4512	5.07	
LaI_{3}	—	Orthorhombic	Cmcm	63	0.4425	1.3979	1.0048	5.55	
LaH_{2}	Black	Cubic	Fm3̅m	225	0.5667	—	—	—	
LaB_{4}	—	Tetragonal	P4/mbm	127	0.7324	—	0.4181	—	
LaB_{6}	—	Cubic	Pm3̅m	221	0.4157	—	—	4.72	
LaC_{2}	—	Tetragonal	I4/mmm	139	0.3934	—	0.6572	—	
La_{2}C_{3}	—	Cubic	I4̅3d	220	0.8817	—	—	6.08	
LaN	—	Cubic	Fm3̅m	225	0.5300	—	—	6.82	
La(OH)_{3}	White	Hexagonal	P6_{3}/m	176	0.6547	—	0.3854	—	
LaPO_{4}	—	Monoclinic	P2_{1}/n	14	—	—	—	—	
LaNi_{5}	—	Hexagonal	P6/mmm	191	0.502	—	0.398	—	

== Chalcogenides ==
=== Oxides ===
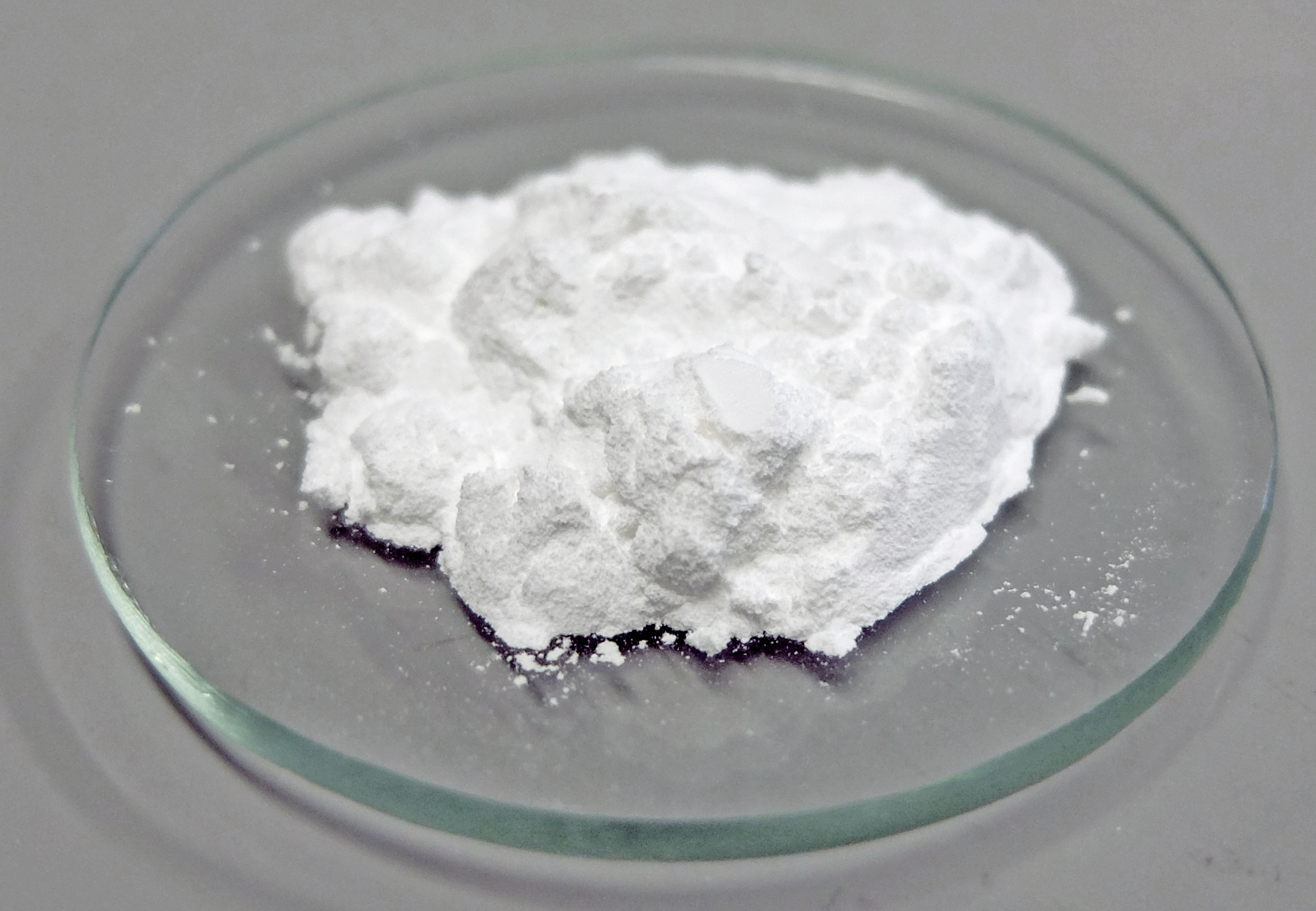
Lanthanum(III) oxide

The principal oxide of lanthanum is lanthanum(III) oxide, La_{2}O_{3}, a white, strongly hygroscopic solid. At ordinary temperatures it adopts the hexagonal A-type rare-earth sesquioxide structure, characteristic of the largest trivalent lanthanide ions. At high temperature it undergoes successive transformations to the hexagonal H-type and cubic X-type modifications. Calorimetric measurements place the A-to-H transition at about 2046 °C and the H-to-X transition at about 2114 °C; melting occurs at about 2301 °C.

Lanthanum oxide reacts readily with water to form lanthanum hydroxide, La(OH)_{3}, in a strongly exothermic reaction. The hydroxide and oxide also absorb atmospheric carbon dioxide, ultimately forming basic carbonates and lanthanum carbonate.

=== Other chalcogenides ===
Lanthanum forms numerous binary chalcogenides with sulfur, selenium and tellurium, including monochalcogenides, sesquichalcogenides and chalcogen-rich polychalcogenides. The equiatomic compounds LaS, LaSe and LaTe are known; like many early-lanthanide monochalcogenides, they have structures related to the cubic rock salt structure.

Lanthanum sesquisulfide, La_{2}S_{3}, is polymorphic. Three principal modifications are traditionally distinguished: low-temperature α-La_{2}S_{3}, which is orthorhombic with space group Pnma; an intermediate tetragonal β-phase; and high-temperature γ-La_{2}S_{3}, which has a cation-deficient cubic Th_{3}P_{4}-type structure, space group I4̅3d. Single-crystal studies of γ-La_{2}S_{3} confirm the defective Th_{3}P_{4} structure, in which the lanthanum sites are statistically occupied. At the ideal La_{2}S_{3} composition, one ninth of the available cation sites are vacant.

The cubic sulfide phase forms part of the non-stoichiometric series La^{−}_{3}xS_{4} (0 ≤ x ≤ 1/3). Its electrical properties depend strongly on the concentration of lanthanum vacancies: La_{3}S_{4} contains an excess conduction electron and is metallic, whereas the vacancy-rich end member La_{2}S_{3} is semiconducting or insulating. This tunable carrier concentration has led to extensive study of cubic lanthanum sulfides as high-temperature thermoelectric materials.

A closely related vacancy-controlled system occurs among the tellurides. Compounds of composition La^{−}_{3}xTe_{4} adopt the Th_{3}P_{4}-type structure, with the lanthanum-vacancy concentration controlling the number of conduction electrons. Increasing x from compositions near La_{3}Te_{4} toward La_{2}Te_{3} changes the material from a heavily doped degenerate semiconductor toward a non-degenerate semiconductor.

Chalcogen-rich phases can contain direct chalcogen–chalcogen bonding rather than being simple ionic salts. Lanthanum disulfide, LaS_{2}, occurs in at least two modifications; the low-temperature monoclinic α-form transforms reversibly to an orthorhombic β-form at about 750 °C. Lanthanum ditelluride, LaTe_{2}, contains distorted tellurium square nets with Te–Te bonding and crystallizes in a monoclinically distorted superstructure of the idealized anti-Fe_{2}As arrangement. Still more chalcogen-rich compounds, including LaSe_{2} and LaTe_{3}, are also known.

== Halides ==
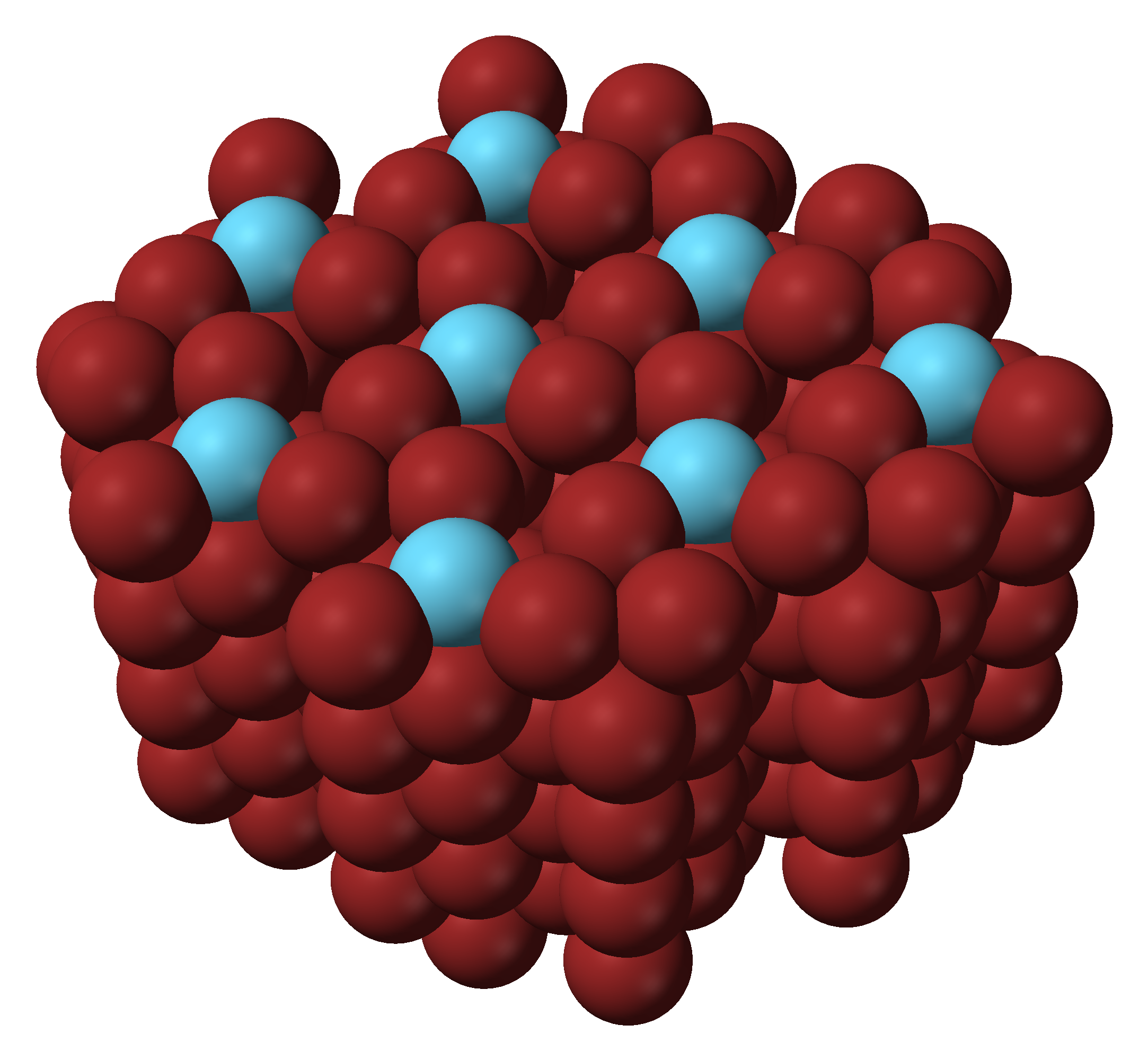
Space-filling model of the crystal structure of lanthanum(III) bromide

Lanthanum forms the four trihalides LaF_{3}, LaCl_{3}, LaBr_{3} and LaI_{3}. They can be prepared by direct reaction of lanthanum metal with the corresponding halogen, while high-purity anhydrous chlorides, bromides and iodides can also be obtained from hydrated salts using the corresponding ammonium halide to suppress hydrolysis during dehydration. Direct heating of hydrated LaCl_{3} or related salts instead tends to give oxyhalides such as LaOCl.

Lanthanum fluoride, LaF_{3}, is sparingly soluble in water and crystallizes in the trigonal tysonite structure, space group P3̅c1. Its structure contains three crystallographically distinct fluoride sites and can be regarded as a close-packed lanthanum framework with fluoride ions occupying interstitial positions. Under pressure, LaF_{3} undergoes a reconstructive structural transition at approximately 20 GPa.

The heavier trihalides are hygroscopic and readily soluble in water. LaCl_{3} and LaBr_{3} both crystallize in the hexagonal UCl_{3} structure type, space group P6_{3}/m, in which lanthanum is nine-coordinate in a tricapped trigonal-prismatic environment. LaI_{3} instead adopts the orthorhombic PuBr_{3} structure type, with eight-coordinate lanthanum centres arranged in layers.

Reduction of the heavier trihalides gives several electron-rich subhalides. In the bromide system, reduction of LaBr_{3} with lithium produces black crystals of LaBr_{2} and La_{2}Br_{5}. LaBr_{2} has a layered 2H-MoS_{2}-type structure with space group P6_{3}/mmc, whereas La_{2}Br_{5} is monoclinic and isostructural with Pr_{2}I_{5}.

The iodide system contains an even wider range of reduced phases. LaI_{2} is a metallic compound in which lanthanum remains essentially trivalent; it is commonly represented as La^{3+}(I^{−})_{2}(e^{−}) with an additional electron occupying a delocalized conduction band rather than as a conventional La^{2+} salt. It crystallizes in a tetragonal MoSi_{2}-type structure and has metallic electrical conductivity.

A further iodine-rich phase, La_{2}I_{5}, crystallizes in the monoclinic space group P2_{1}/m and is isostructural with Pr_{2}I_{5}. Still stronger reduction gives lanthanum monoiodide, LaI. It can be prepared by reducing LaI_{2} or LaI_{3} with sodium metal at about 550 °C and exhibits metallic conductivity between 10 and 300 K.

At very high pressures, still more reduced lanthanum chlorides have been obtained. Laser-heating lanthanum with sodium chloride at around 80 GPa produced La_{2}Cl and LaCl, together with a new high-pressure polymorph of LaCl_{3}. LaCl adopts an orthorhombic TlI-type structure, while La_{2}Cl has a tetragonal structure related to the anti-LaI_{2} arrangement.

== Hydrides ==
Lanthanum reacts readily and exothermically with hydrogen to form non-stoichiometric hydrides. The hydrogen-poor phase is based on lanthanum dihydride, LaH_{2}, a black, brittle and pyrophoric solid with the cubic fluorite structure. In this structure the lanthanum atoms form a face-centred cubic lattice and hydride ions occupy the tetrahedral interstices. LaH^{+}_{2}x can accommodate additional hydrogen in the octahedral interstices while largely retaining the metal sublattice.

The electronic properties change strongly with hydrogen content. Dihydride-rich compositions are metallic conductors, whereas increasing the hydrogen concentration toward LaH_{3} causes the electrical conductivity to decrease by several orders of magnitude and gives semiconducting behaviour. The LaH_{2}–LaH_{3} system is not structurally simple: X-ray studies over LaH_{1.93}–LaH_{2.90} found several composition ranges showing low-temperature cubic-to-tetragonal distortions and hydrogen ordering. Stoichiometric LaH_{3} is conventionally described using a cubic structure related to the BiF_{3} type, although experimental and theoretical studies indicate that lower-symmetry distortions can occur.

The unusual metallic state of LaH^{+}_{2}x has also been interpreted in terms of electride chemistry. Electronic-structure studies describe the fluorite-type lanthanum dihydrides as hydride-based electrides in which itinerant electrons occupy interstitial cavities surrounded by H^{−} ions. Similar behaviour occurs in the corresponding cerium and yttrium hydrides.

At megabar pressures, lanthanum forms much more hydrogen-rich compounds known as superhydrides. Heating lanthanum in excess hydrogen at pressures near 170 GPa produces a phase with a face-centred cubic lanthanum sublattice consistent with LaH_{10}. In the predicted and experimentally supported cubic structure, space group Fm3̅m, each lanthanum atom is enclosed by a cage of 32 hydrogen atoms.

LaH_{10} is superconducting at very high pressure. Electrical-resistance measurements on samples with the cubic Fm3̅m structure found a superconducting transition at about 250 K under pressures around 170 GPa. The assignment was supported by zero electrical resistance, suppression of the transition temperature by an applied magnetic field, and an isotope effect in the corresponding deuteride. Subsequent calculations incorporating quantum nuclear motion support a highly symmetric cubic structure over much of the experimentally investigated pressure range.

== Borides ==
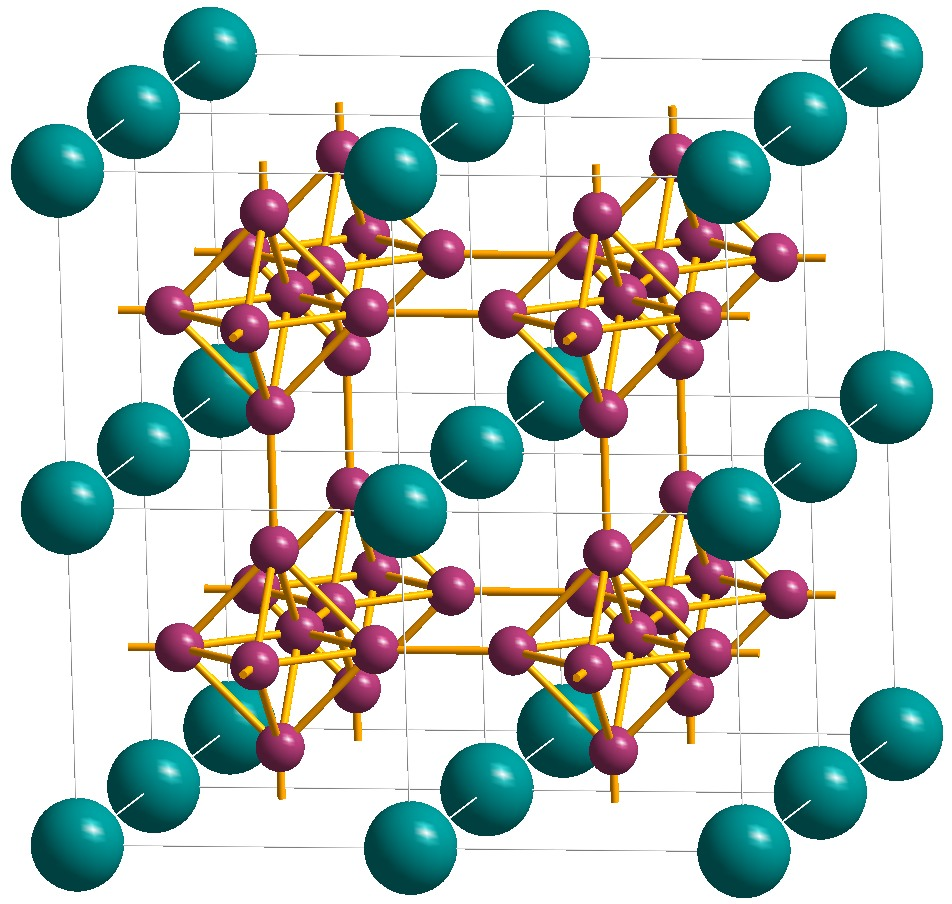
CaB6-type crystal structure adopted by lanthanum hexaboride

Lanthanum forms two well-established binary borides at ambient pressure, lanthanum tetraboride (LaB_{4}) and lanthanum hexaboride (LaB_{6}). Phase-equilibrium studies of the La–B system found LaB_{4} to have only a narrow homogeneity range and to decompose peritectically at about 1800 °C, whereas LaB_{6} is stable over a small range of boron-rich compositions and remains stable to substantially higher temperatures. Rare-earth borides are characterized by covalently bonded boron frameworks whose structures change markedly with boron content.

LaB_{4} crystallizes in the tetragonal ThB_{4} structure type, space group P4/mbm, with four formula units per unit cell. Single-crystal measurements give lattice parameters of approximately a = 0.7324 nm and c = 0.4181 nm. Its boron sublattice contains both B_{6} octahedra and chains of boron atoms, giving a strongly covalently bonded three-dimensional framework. LaB_{4} is metallic, hard and brittle.

LaB_{6} is the better-known lanthanum boride. It crystallizes in the cubic CaB6 structure type, space group Pm3̅m, with a lattice parameter of about 0.4157 nm. The structure consists of a simple cubic array of B_{6} octahedra joined by B–B bonds, with lanthanum atoms occupying the large cavities between them. LaB_{6} is metallic and combines a high melting temperature, low vapour pressure and chemical stability with a comparatively low electronic work function.

The work function of LaB_{6} depends on crystallographic orientation and surface composition. Measurements on clean single-crystal faces generally give values in the range of about 2.4–2.9 eV, with low-index surfaces such as (100) showing particularly efficient electron emission. This combination of low work function and low evaporation rate at elevated temperature makes LaB_{6} an important thermionic emitter, particularly as an electron source in electron microscopes and related instruments.

== Carbides and silicides ==
Lanthanum forms two principal binary carbides, lanthanum dicarbide, LaC_{2}, and lanthanum sesquicarbide, La_{2}C_{3}. The La–C phase diagram contains broad homogeneity ranges around the sesquicarbide composition, while LaC_{2} is stable close to the ideal 1:2 stoichiometry. Both can be prepared by high-temperature reaction of lanthanum metal with carbon.

At room temperature LaC_{2} adopts the tetragonal calcium carbide structure type, space group I4/mmm, with carbon present as C–C pairs. Neutron diffraction gave lattice parameters a ≈ 0.3934 nm and c ≈ 0.6572 nm, with a C–C distance of about 0.128 nm. It is metallic and becomes superconducting below about 1.8 K, with properties consistent with weak-coupling BCS superconductivity.

La_{2}C_{3} crystallizes in the cubic Pu_{2}C_{3} structure type, space group I4̅3d, with eight formula units per unit cell. Its structure likewise contains C–C pairs, enclosed by distorted lanthanum coordination polyhedra. La_{2}C_{3} is superconducting, and carefully prepared carbon-deficient samples show transition temperatures around 13.2–13.3 K. The cubic structure remains stable to at least 30 GPa at room temperature.

Lanthanum also forms numerous binary silicides. The ambient-pressure La–Si phase diagram contains La_{5}Si_{3}, La_{3}Si_{2}, La_{5}Si_{4}, LaSi and silicon-deficient disilicide phases conventionally written LaSi^{−}_{2}x. La_{5}Si_{3} adopts the tetragonal Cr_{5}B_{3} structure type, La_{3}Si_{2} the U_{3}Si_{2} type, La_{5}Si_{4} the Zr_{5}Si_{4} type and LaSi the orthorhombic FeB type.

The disilicide region is structurally more complex. Two closely related phases occur near LaSi_{2}, one with the α-GdSi_{2} structure type and the other with the α-ThSi_{2} structure type; both are appreciably silicon-deficient rather than strictly stoichiometric LaSi_{2}. LaSi and the α-GdSi_{2}-type disilicide melt congruently at about 1620 and 1730 °C respectively, whereas the other intermediate silicides form peritectically.

Much more silicon-rich lanthanum silicides can be stabilized at high pressure. At 13.5 GPa, the binary system contains superconducting LaSi_{5} and LaSi_{10}, neither of which is stable under ordinary pressure–temperature conditions. LaSi_{5} occurs in two polymorphs; the α-form crystallizes in the monoclinic space group C2/m. Both high-pressure silicides contain extended silicon frameworks and exhibit superconductivity at low temperature.

== Pnictides ==
Lanthanum forms the complete series of equiatomic monopnictides LaN, LaP, LaAs, LaSb and LaBi. At ambient pressure they adopt the cubic rock salt structure, space group Fm3̅m, with octahedral coordination of both elements.

Lanthanum nitride, LaN, can be prepared as a polycrystalline powder by mechanochemical reaction under nitrogen. X-ray and electron diffraction confirm the rock-salt structure characteristic of the lanthanide mononitrides. More nitrogen-rich lanthanum nitrides can be stabilized at high pressure. Reaction of lanthanum with supercritical nitrogen at about 30 GPa and 2000 K produced two phases assigned approximately as La_{2}N^{+}_{3}x: a cubic phase related to the Mn_{2}O_{3} structure and a trigonal phase with the same basic structure type as A-La_{2}O_{3}.

LaP and LaAs are likewise rock-salt monopnictides. Their valence bands are dominated by pnictogen p states, while the lowest conduction states are primarily La 5d in character. The degree of overlap between these bands increases along the series toward the heavier pnictides, giving progressively more semimetallic behaviour. LaAs is a compensated semimetal and exhibits extreme magnetoresistance at low temperature and high magnetic field, despite having no experimentally observed band inversion at ambient pressure.

The heavier monopnictides LaSb and LaBi are semimetals with small, nearly compensated electron and hole pockets. LaSb displays extreme magnetoresistance: measurements on single crystals found an increase in resistivity of about one million percent at 9 T at low temperature, together with a low-temperature resistivity plateau. Similar extreme magnetoresistance occurs in LaBi.

The possible relation between this behaviour and electronic band topology has been extensively studied. Angle-resolved photoemission measurements show a clear inversion between La 5d and Bi 6p bands in LaBi, consistent with a topologically non-trivial semimetal, whereas LaSb lies close to the band-inversion boundary and LaAs shows no inversion at ambient pressure. The occurrence of extreme magnetoresistance in topologically trivial LaAs indicates that band topology alone is not required for the effect; electron–hole compensation and carrier mobility also contribute substantially to the transport behaviour.

== Other inorganic compounds ==
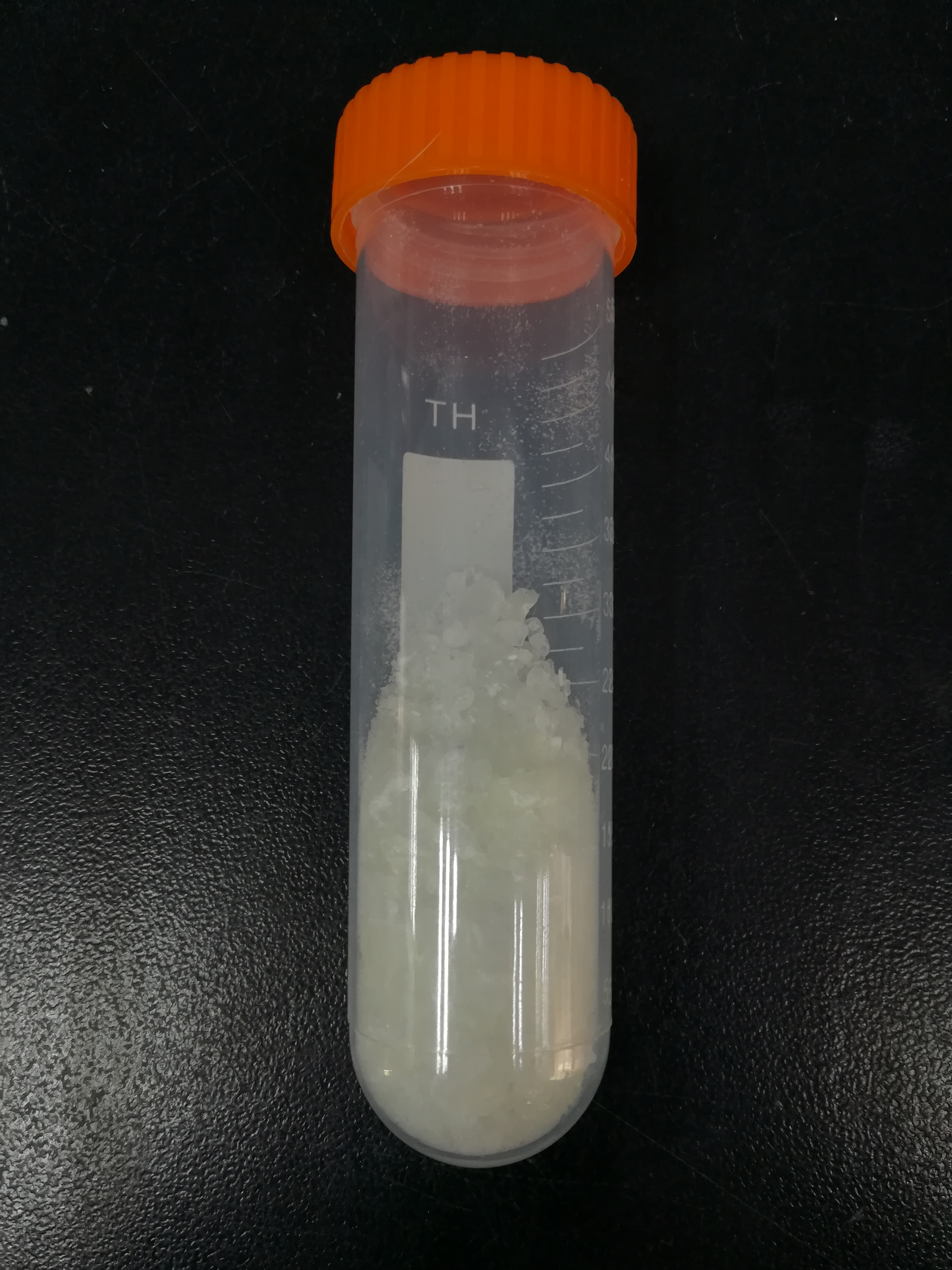
Lanthanum(III) nitrate

Lanthanum hydroxide, La(OH)_{3}, is obtained by precipitation from aqueous La^{3+} solutions with hydroxide ions and is also formed rapidly when La_{2}O_{3} is exposed to water. It crystallizes in the hexagonal space group P6_{3}/m, with two formula units per unit cell; each lanthanum centre is nine-coordinate in a tricapped trigonal-prismatic environment.

Lanthanum nitrate is commonly isolated as the hexahydrate La(NO_{3})_{3}·6H_{2}O. Its dehydration is complex and depends on the water-vapour pressure. On further heating, nitrate-containing intermediates are formed; above about 350 °C the products include LaONO_{3} and La_{3}O_{4}NO_{3}, followed ultimately by La_{2}O_{3}.

Lanthanum oxalate forms the decahydrate La_{2}(C_{2}O_{4})_{3}·10H_{2}O. It crystallizes in the monoclinic space group P2_{1}/c, with two formula units per unit cell. Each La^{3+} ion is coordinated by three chelating oxalate groups and three water molecules, while additional water molecules occupy the spaces between the coordination layers.

Lanthanum(III) sulfate, La_{2}(SO_{4})_{3}, forms several hydrates. The nonahydrate La_{2}(SO_{4})_{3}·9H_{2}O crystallizes in a hexagonal structure with two crystallographically distinct lanthanum environments. An octahydrate is also known; it crystallizes in the monoclinic space group Pn with two formula units per unit cell.

Lanthanum carbonate occurs in several hydrated forms. Lanthanum carbonate octahydrate, La_{2}(CO_{3})_{3}·8H_{2}O, has a layered structure in which carbonate groups link lanthanum centres and additional water molecules occupy the interlayer region. A pentahydrate, La_{2}(CO_{3})_{3}·5H_{2}O, has also been characterized; it crystallizes in the orthorhombic space group Pbca and contains related carbonate–lanthanum layers separated by a disordered interlayer region containing carbonate and water.

Lanthanum phosphate, LaPO_{4}, occurs in both hydrated and anhydrous forms. Hydrated lanthanum phosphate can adopt the hexagonal rhabdophane structure, conventionally written approximately LaPO_{4}·0.5H_{2}O, whereas heating above about 650 °C converts it to the monoclinic monazite structure, space group P2_{1}/n. In monazite-type LaPO_{4}, lanthanum is coordinated by nine oxygen atoms in a distorted polyhedron.

== Coordination compounds ==
Structure of [La(acac)_{3}(H_{2}O)_{2}], an eight-coordinate lanthanum(III) complex

Lanthanum(III), as the largest of the trivalent lanthanide ions, commonly forms complexes with high coordination numbers. Bonding is predominantly ionic and shows relatively little directional preference, so the coordination number and geometry are strongly influenced by ligand size, denticity and solvent. Hard oxygen donors are particularly common, although nitrogen- and mixed-donor ligands are also widely used. Coordination numbers from about 8 to 12 are well established for La^{3+}.

An example is the acetylacetonate complex [La(acac)_{3}(H_{2}O)_{2}], in which three bidentate acetylacetonate ligands and two water molecules give an eight-coordinate LaO_{8} environment. X-ray crystallography shows that the coordination geometry is close to a square antiprism.

The large size of La^{3+} also allows unusually high coordination numbers in nitrate complexes. Reaction of hydrated lanthanum nitrate with 2,2′:6′,2″-terpyridine in acetonitrile gives [La(terpy)(NO_{3})_{3}(H_{2}O)_{2}], in which lanthanum is eleven-coordinate: the terpyridine contributes three nitrogen donors, the three nitrate groups are bidentate and two water molecules complete the coordination sphere. Under comparable conditions, the smaller lanthanides form analogous complexes with lower coordination numbers. The composition and coordination geometry of lanthanum complexes can therefore depend strongly on the solvent and crystallization conditions.

== Organolanthanum compounds ==
Organolanthanum compounds contain strongly polarized La–C bonds and are known with cyclopentadienyl, alkyl and other carbon-based ligands. Lanthanum normally remains in the +3 oxidation state in these compounds. As in organometallic compounds of the other lanthanides, the bonding has a substantial ionic component, although multihapto ligands such as cyclopentadienyl groups can form stable complexes.

=== Cyclopentadienyl complexes ===
The classical cyclopentadienyl compound La(C_{5}H_{5})_{3} can be prepared by salt metathesis of anhydrous LaCl_{3} with sodium cyclopentadienide in tetrahydrofuran. In the solid state, base-free La(C_{5}H_{5})_{3} is not a simple discrete tris(cyclopentadienyl) molecule, but forms a polymeric structure. The cyclopentadienyl ligands exhibit several different modes of interaction with neighbouring lanthanum centres in addition to conventional η^{5} coordination.

Bulkier substituted cyclopentadienyl ligands can instead stabilize soluble molecular complexes and leave space for additional ligands bound directly to lanthanum. Bis(pentamethylcyclopentadienyl) lanthanum halides and alkyl derivatives were among the early examples of such compounds.

=== Alkyl and hydride complexes ===
Well-defined La–C σ-bonded complexes can be stabilized by bulky ligand environments. For example, substituted lanthanocene alkyl complexes of the form [η^{−}_{5}_{1},^{−}_{3}(Me_{3}C)_{2}C_{5}H_{3}]_{2}La(CH_{2}C_{6}H^{−}_{4}o^{−}NMe_{2}) have been isolated by salt metathesis with the corresponding organolithium reagent. The polarized La–C bond is reactive toward small molecules: sulfur and selenium give thiolate and selenolate derivatives, while nitriles, carbodiimides and isothiocyanates undergo insertion reactions.

Molecular lanthanum hydrides are likewise accessible when sufficiently bulky ligands prevent aggregation or decomposition. Hydrogenolysis of a pentaarylcyclopentadienyl-supported lanthanum dibenzyl complex gives the dinuclear hydride [(Cp(Ar_{5}))La(^{−}H)]_{2}, in which hydride ligands bridge the two lanthanum centres. Lanthanum alkyl and hydride complexes are also used as reactive intermediates and catalysts in carbon–carbon bond-forming and polymerization chemistry.

== Alloys and intermetallic compounds ==
Lanthanum forms numerous intermetallic compounds with transition metals and other metallic elements. Well-characterized families include compounds of the La–Ni and La–Co systems, together with ternary iron-rich phases related to the NaZn_{13} structure.

=== Lanthanum–nickel compounds ===
Lanthanum-nickel alloys, particularly LaNi_{5}, have been extensively studied because LaNi_{5} reacts reversibly with hydrogen. LaNi_{5} crystallizes in the hexagonal CaCu_{5} structure type, space group P6/mmm, with lanthanum occupying the 1a site and nickel occupying two crystallographically distinct sites, 2c and 3g. Typical lattice parameters are approximately a = 0.502 nm and c = 0.398 nm.

The structure contains several interstitial sites that can accommodate hydrogen without destroying the underlying metal lattice. Near room temperature, LaNi_{5} can reversibly absorb approximately six to seven hydrogen atoms per formula unit, producing hydride compositions conventionally written near LaNi_{5}H_{6}. Hydrogen occupies both tetrahedral and octahedral interstices, causing substantial expansion of the unit cell. The reaction is reversible at pressures close to ambient under suitable conditions, making LaNi_{5} and substituted AB_{5}-type alloys important hydrogen-storage materials.

Substitution of nickel by elements such as cobalt, manganese, aluminium or copper modifies the lattice dimensions and the thermodynamics of hydride formation. Such substituted LaNi_{5}-type alloys have been widely used as hydrogen-storage electrodes in nickel–metal hydride batteries.

=== Lanthanum–cobalt compounds ===
The La–Co system contains several binary intermetallic phases. Reported compounds include La_{3}Co, La_{2}Co_{3}, La_{2}Co_{7}, LaCo_{5} and LaCo_{13}, together with additional intermediate compositions. LaCo_{5} adopts the same hexagonal CaCu_{5} structure type as LaNi_{5}, while LaCo_{13} crystallizes in the cubic NaZn_{13} structure type.

The structures of several rare-earth–cobalt phases can be related through ordered replacement of rare-earth atoms by pairs of cobalt atoms. This produces families of structures at compositions between the RCo_{5} and cobalt-richer limits, including the 2:7 and 1:13 stoichiometries.

=== Iron-rich intermetallics ===
A binary compound of ideal composition LaFe_{13} is not stable at ambient pressure. Partial replacement of iron by silicon or aluminium, however, stabilizes compounds such as LaFe^{−}_{13}xSix and LaFe^{−}_{13}xAlx with the cubic NaZn_{13} structure type, space group Fm3̅c. In these structures lanthanum occupies the 8a position, while iron and the substituting element occupy the transition-metal sublattice; one iron site is surrounded by an icosahedron of twelve neighbouring transition-metal atoms.

The magnetic properties of LaFe^{−}_{13}xSix depend strongly on composition. Silicon-rich compositions can undergo first-order magnetostructural transitions accompanied by large changes in magnetic entropy, and related La(Fe,Si)_{13} materials have consequently been studied for magnetocaloric refrigeration.

== Applications ==
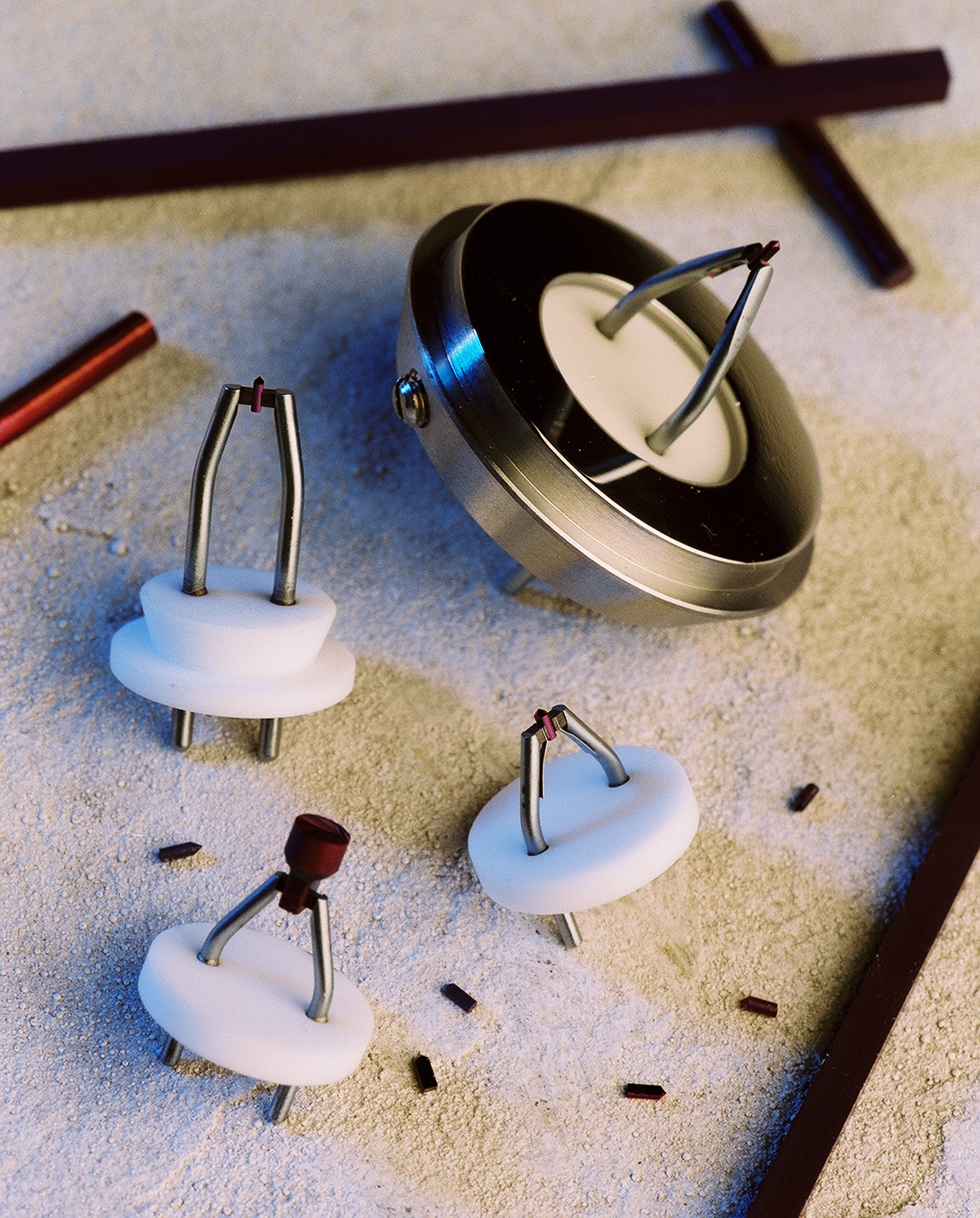
Lanthanum hexaboride cathodes used as thermionic electron emitters

Lanthanum hexaboride is widely used as a thermionic electron emitter. Its low work function, high melting temperature and low evaporation rate allow LaB_{6} cathodes to operate at lower temperatures and with longer lifetimes than conventional tungsten emitters. Single-crystal and polycrystalline LaB_{6} cathodes are used as high-brightness electron sources in electron microscopes, electron-beam lithography systems and other electron-optical instruments.

Cerium-doped lanthanum bromide, LaBr_{3}:Ce, is a high-performance scintillator for X-ray and gamma-ray detection. It combines a high light yield of more than 60,000 photons per MeV with a decay time of about 16 ns and an energy resolution of approximately 3% at 662 keV. LaBr_{3}:Ce detectors are used in gamma-ray spectroscopy and have been applied in nuclear and particle physics, medical imaging, security screening and geophysical measurements. Their use for very-low-background measurements is complicated by intrinsic radioactivity, principally from naturally occurring ^{138}La.

LaNi_{5} and related AB_{5} intermetallic compounds are used for reversible hydrogen storage. Their relatively rapid hydrogen absorption and desorption, good reversibility and operation near ambient temperature have also led to electrochemical applications. Substituted LaNi_{5}-type alloys form the negative-electrode material in many nickel–metal hydride batteries, while related materials have been investigated for hydrogen compression, purification and heat-management systems.

Lanthanum carbonate is used medicinally as a non-calcium, non-aluminium phosphate binder. In the gastrointestinal tract, La^{3+} released from the salt binds dietary phosphate to form poorly soluble lanthanum phosphate, reducing phosphate absorption. It is used to control hyperphosphatemia in patients with chronic kidney disease, particularly those receiving dialysis. Systematic reviews have found it effective in lowering serum phosphate, with a lower risk of hypercalcaemia than calcium-containing phosphate binders.

Lanthanum compounds are also used in heterogeneous catalysis. Rare-earth-modified Y-type zeolites are important components of fluid catalytic cracking catalysts used in petroleum refining; incorporation of lanthanum and related rare-earth ions increases the hydrothermal stability and Brønsted acidity of the zeolite and can improve its resistance to deactivation. Lanthanum(III) oxide itself has also been extensively investigated as a basic catalyst, including for the oxidative coupling of methane to ethane and ethylene.

The high dielectric constant of La_{2}O_{3} has led to extensive study of lanthanum-based oxides as high-k dielectric materials for metal–oxide–semiconductor devices. Their practical use is complicated by the hygroscopicity of La_{2}O_{3}, oxygen-related defects and interfacial reactions, and approaches including nitrogen incorporation, alloying with other high-k oxides and post-deposition treatment have been investigated to improve device performance.

Lanthanum fluoride is a constituent of fluoride optical glasses. In particular, the widely used ZBLAN composition contains ZrF_{4}, BaF_{2}, LaF_{3}, AlF_{3} and NaF. Its broad transparency range and relatively low phonon energy make ZBLAN suitable for mid-infrared optical fibres and as a host for rare-earth-doped fibre lasers and amplifiers.

== Gallery ==
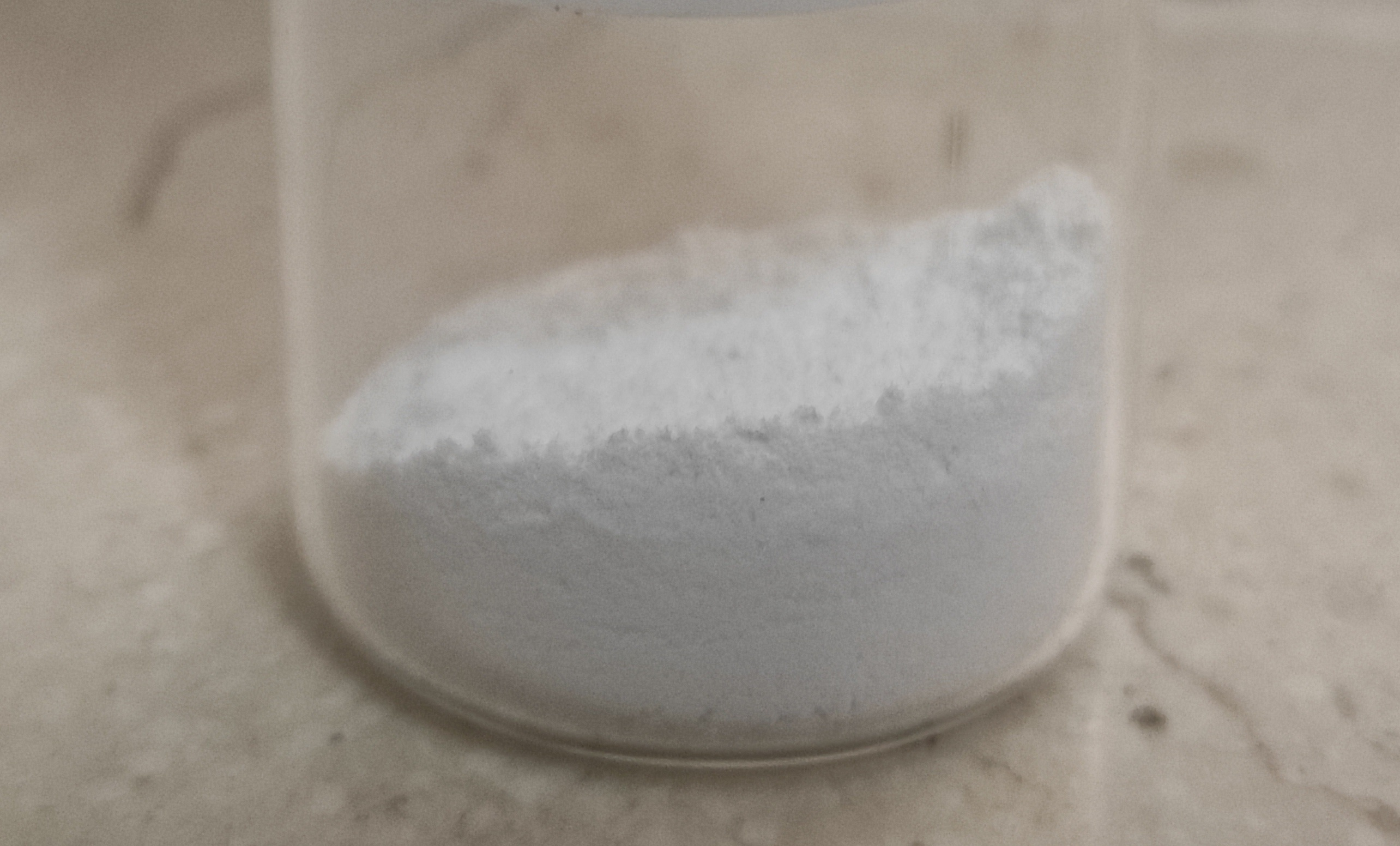
Anhydrous lanthanum(III) chloride

Lanthanum(III) hydroxide

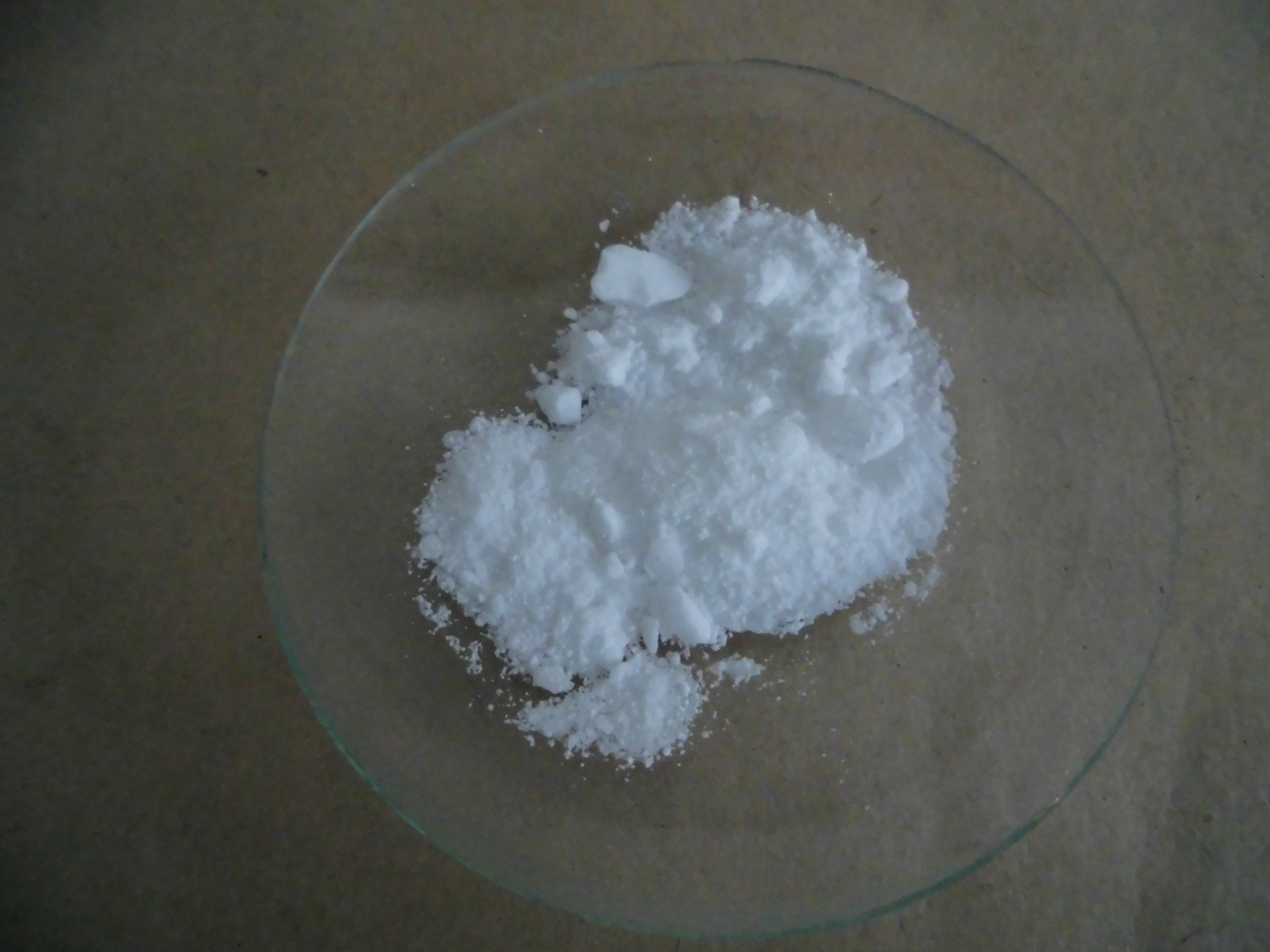
Hydrated lanthanum(III) nitrate

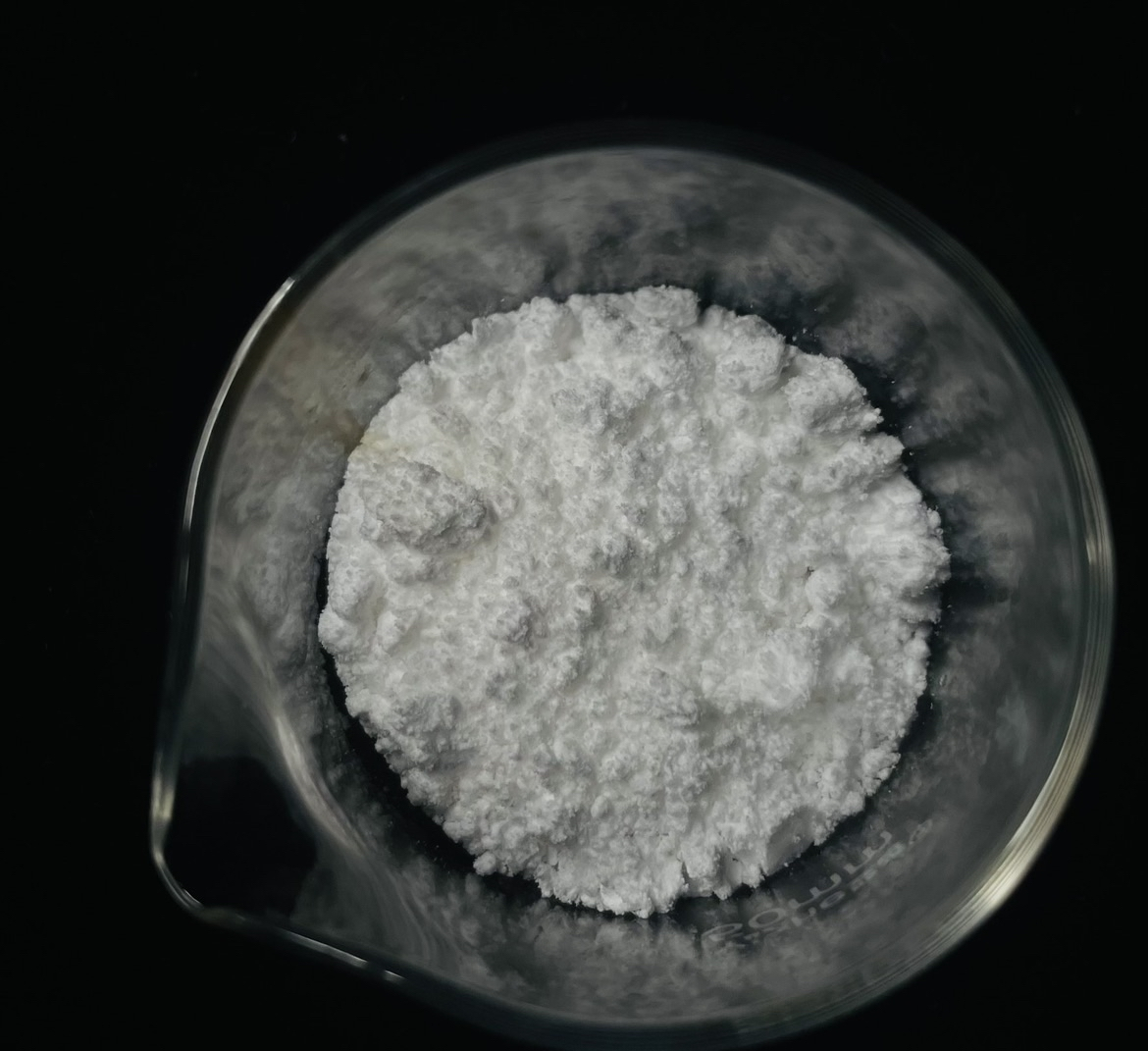
Lanthanum(III) sulfate nonahydrate

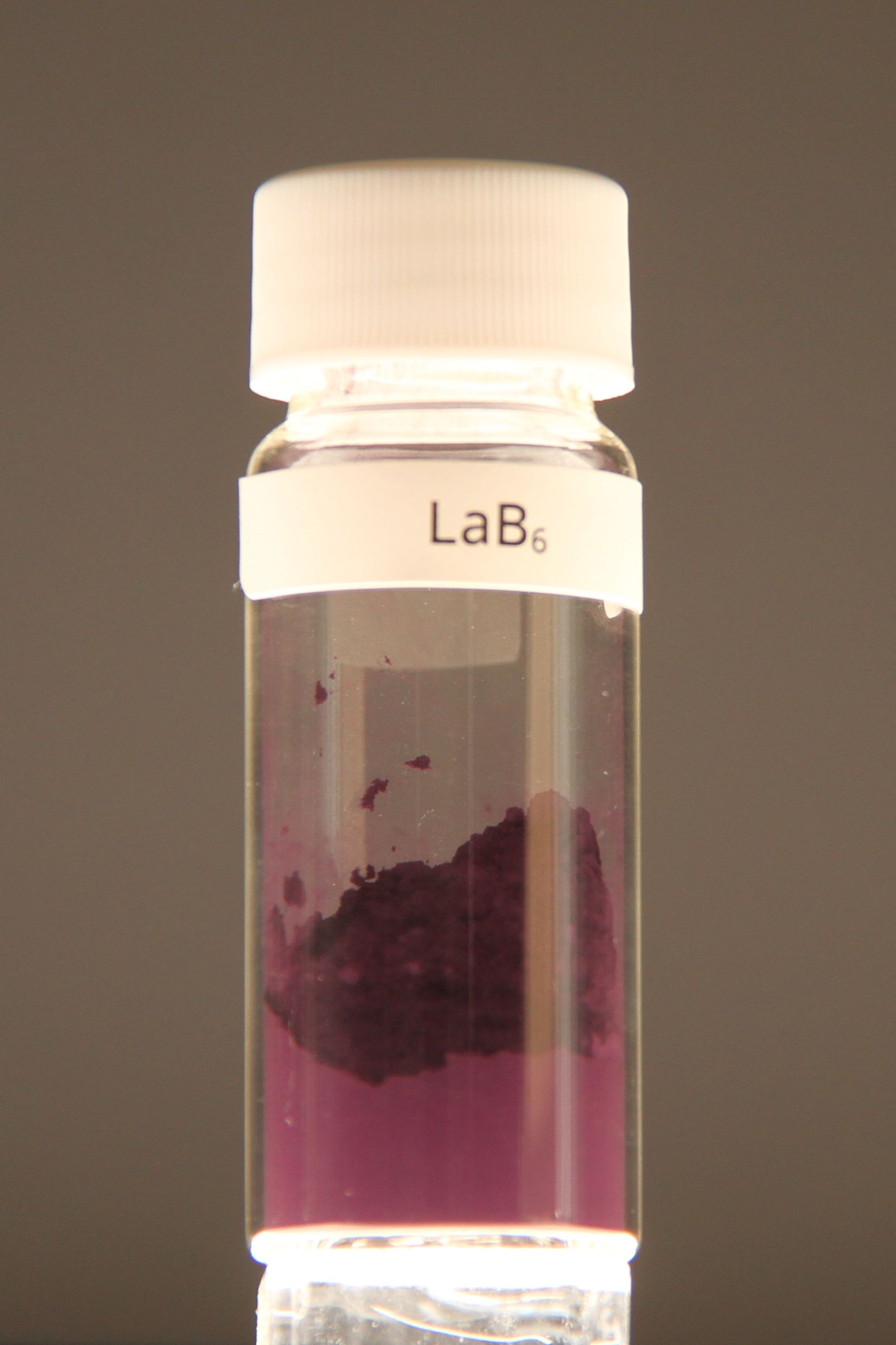
Lanthanum hexaboride

Polyhedral representation of the A-type lanthanum(III) oxide structure

== See also ==
- Scandium compounds
- Yttrium compounds
- Cerium compounds
