= Actinium(III) hydroxide =

Names
- Other names Actinium hydroxide

Identifiers
CAS Number	12249-30-8
3D model (JSmol)	Interactive image
- InChI: InChI=1S/Ac.3H2O/h;3*1H2/q+3;;;/p-3 Key: FXNGTWJQBRAZDM-UHFFFAOYSA-K
- SMILES: [Ac+3].[OH-].[OH-].[OH-]

Properties
Chemical formula	Ac(OH)_{3}
Molar mass	278 g/mol (^{227}Ac)
Appearance	white solid
Solubility in water	0.021 in water (20 °C)

Related compounds
Other anions	actinium(III) oxide
Other cations	scandium(III) hydroxide yttrium(III) hydroxide lanthanum(III) hydroxide
- Except where otherwise noted, data are given for materials in their standard state (at 25 °C [77 °F], 100 kPa). Infobox references

Actinium(III) hydroxide is a white radioactive solid with the chemical formula of Ac(OH)_{3}.

== Preparation ==
Actinium(III) hydroxide may be formed from soluble actinium salts and alkalis or ammonia water, and the resulting gel is precipitated as the product:

Ac^{3+} + 3 OH^{−} → Ac(OH)_{3}↓

Its solubility is slightly greater than that of lanthanum hydroxide, but it is still insoluble in water.

== Chemical properties ==
Actinium(III) hydroxide is an alkaline hydroxide, it can react with acids to obtain actinium salts:

Ac(OH)_{3} + 3 HNO_{3} → Ac(NO_{3})_{3} + 3 H_{2}O
