= Scandium compounds =

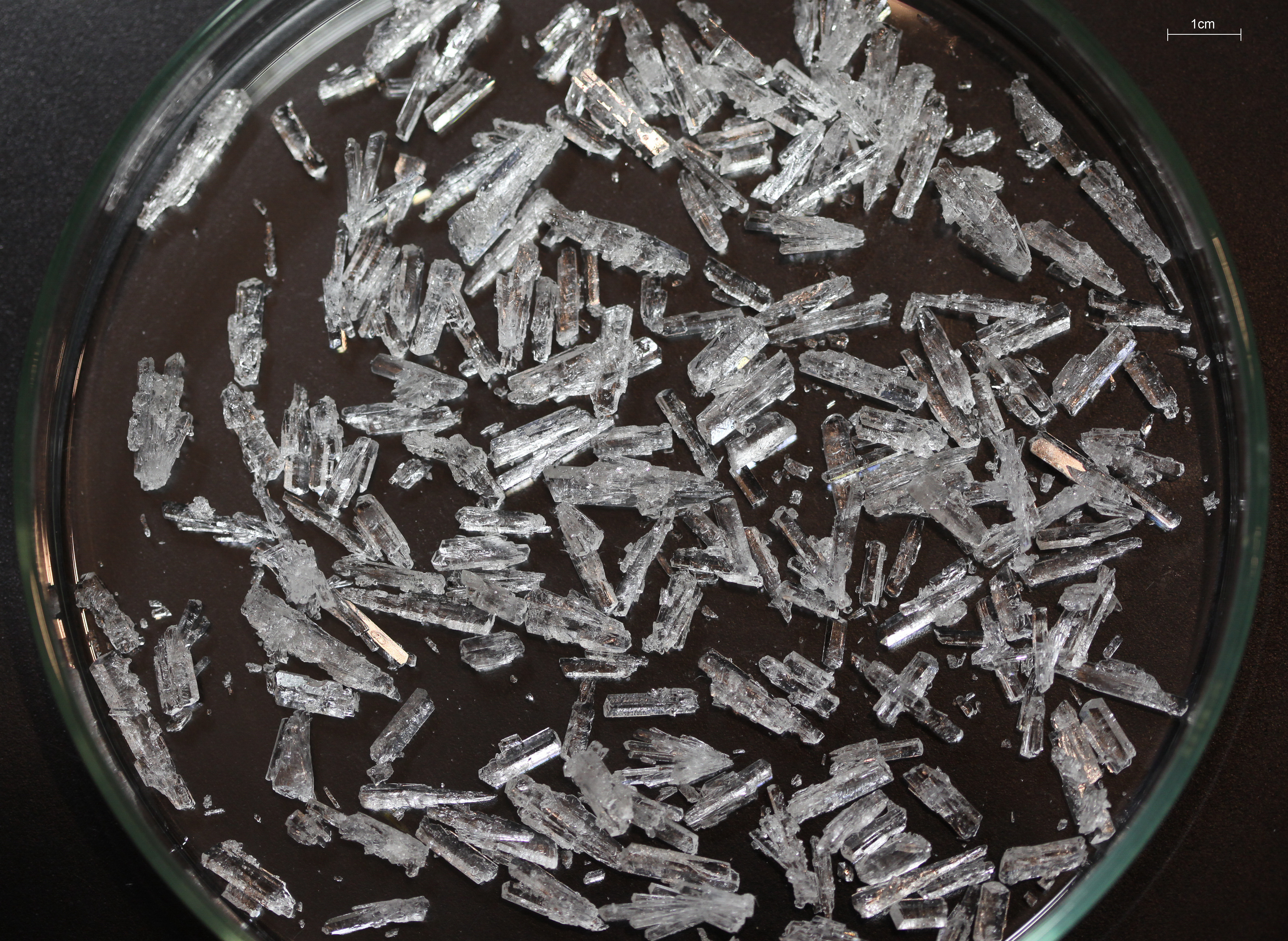
Scandium chloride, a compound of scandium

Ionic radii (pm)
Al	Sc	Y	La	Lu
53.5	74.5	90.0	103.2	86.1

Scandium compounds are compounds containing the element scandium. The chemistry of scandium is almost completely dominated by the trivalent ion, Sc^{3+}, due to its electron configuration, [Ar] 3d^{1}4s^{2}. The radii of M^{3+} ions in the table below indicate that the chemical properties of scandium ions have more in common with yttrium ions than with aluminium ions. In part because of this similarity, scandium is often classified as a lanthanide-like element.

== +3 oxidation state ==
=== Oxides and hydroxides ===
The oxide Sc_{2}O_{3} and the hydroxide Sc(OH)_{3} are amphoteric:

Sc(OH)_{3} + 3 OH^{−} → [Sc(OH)_{6}]^{3−} (scandate ion)
Sc(OH)_{3} + 3 H^{+} + 3 H_{2}O → [Sc(H_{2}O)_{6}]^{3+}

α- and γ-ScOOH are isostructural with their aluminium hydroxide oxide counterparts. Solutions of Sc^{3+} in water are acidic due to hydrolysis.

=== Halides and pseudohalides ===
The halides ScX_{3}, where X= Cl, Br, or I, are very soluble in water, but ScF_{3} is insoluble. In all four halides, the scandium is 6-coordinated. They can be prepared by reacting scandium oxide or scandium hydroxide with the corresponding acid:

Sc(OH)_{3} + 3 HX → ScX_{3} + 3 H_{2}O

The halides are Lewis acids; for example, ScF_{3} dissolves in a solution containing excess fluoride ion to form [ScF_{6}]^{3−}. The coordination number 6 is typical for Sc(III). In the larger Y^{3+} and La^{3+} ions, coordination numbers of 8 and 9 are common. Scandium triflate is sometimes used as a Lewis acid catalyst in organic chemistry.

== Other oxidation states ==
Compounds that feature scandium in oxidation states other than +3 are rare but well characterized. The blue-black compound CsScCl_{3} is one of the simplest. This material adopts a sheet-like structure that exhibits extensive bonding between the scandium(II) centers. Scandium hydride is not well understood, although it appears not to be a saline hydride of Sc(II). As is observed for most elements, a diatomic scandium hydride has been observed spectroscopically at high temperatures in the gas phase. Scandium borides and carbides are non-stoichiometric, as is typical for neighboring elements.

Lower oxidation states (+2, +1, 0) have also been observed in organoscandium compounds.

== Organic derivatives ==
Scandium forms a series of organometallic compounds with cyclopentadienyl ligands (Cp), similar to the behavior of the lanthanides. One example is the chlorine-bridged dimer, [ScCp_{2}Cl]_{2} and related derivatives of pentamethylcyclopentadienyl ligands.

== See also ==
- Yttrium compounds
- Titanium compounds
