= Lanthanum hafnate =

Ceramic metal compound

Identifiers
3D model (JSmol)	Interactive image
- InChI: InChI=1S/2Hf.2La.7O/q2*+4;2*+3;7*-2 Key: AUXGONVMFPDWKD-UHFFFAOYSA-N
- SMILES: [La+3].[La+3].[Hf+4].[Hf+4].[O-2].[O-2].[O-2].[O-2].[O-2].[O-2].[O-2]

Properties
Chemical formula	La_{2}Hf_{2}O_{7}
Molar mass	746.79 g/mol
Appearance	colorless solid
Density	7.86 g/cm^{3}
Band gap	4.233 eV

Structure
Crystal structure	Cubic
Space group	Fm3m (< 1000 °C); Fd3m (> 1000 °C)

Related compounds
Other cations	Lanthanum zirconate
- Except where otherwise noted, data are given for materials in their standard state (at 25 °C [77 °F], 100 kPa). Infobox references

Lanthanum hafnate (La_{2}Hf_{2}O_{7}) or lanthanum hafnium oxide is a mixed oxide of lanthanum and hafnium.

== Properties ==
Lanthanum hafnate is a colorless ceramic material with the La and Hf atoms arranged in a cubic lattice. The arrangement is a disordered fluorite-like structure below 1,000 °C (1,270 K; 1,830 °F), above which it transitions to a pyrochlore phase; an amorphous phase also exists below 800 °C (1,070 K; 1,470 °F).

The compound decomposes into its constituent oxides at 18 GPa.

=== Luminescence ===
Oxygen vacancies in the base material give luminescence spanning across the visible light spectrum, with a peak near 460 nm. The luminescent properties can be fine-tuned by doping with various rare earth and group 4 metals; for example, La_{2}Hf_{2}O_{7}:Eu^{3+} nanoparticles exhibit a red photoluminescence or radioluminescence near 612 nm when exposed to ultraviolet or X-ray radiation.

== Synthesis ==
Bulk ceramics can obtained by combusting the elements in powder form, and then pressing and sintering the powder at 180 MPa and 1,850 °C (2,120 K; 3,360 °F) for 6 hours:

4 La + 4 Hf + 7 O_{2} → 2 La_{2}Hf_{2}O_{7}

It may also be made by precipitating hafnium and lanthanum hydroxides from solution and then calcinating in air at 600–1,400 °C (873–1,673 K; 1,112–2,552 °F) for 3 hours:

2 La(OH)_{3} + 2 Hf(OH)_{4} → La_{2}Hf_{2}O_{7} + 7 H_{2}O.
