= Scandium acetate =

Names
- Other names Scandium(III) acetate Scandium ethanoate Scandium(III) ethanoate

Identifiers
CAS Number	3804-23-7; hydrate: 304675-64-7
3D model (JSmol)	Interactive image; hydrate: Interactive image
ChemSpider	141219
ECHA InfoCard	100.021.159
EC Number	223-274-5
PubChem CID	160721; hydrate: 16212068
CompTox Dashboard (EPA)	DTXSID80890582
- InChI: InChI=1S/3C2H4O2.Sc/c3*1-2(3)4;/h3*1H3,(H,3,4);/q;;;+3/p-3 Key: DBTMQFKUVICLQN-UHFFFAOYSA-K; hydrate: InChI=1S/3C2H4O2.H2O.Sc/c3*1-2(3)4;;/h3*1H3,(H,3,4);1H2; Key: NAXGMQHCOOEQLP-UHFFFAOYSA-N
- SMILES: CC(=O)O.CC(=O)O.CC(=O)O.[Sc]; hydrate: CC(=O)O.CC(=O)O.CC(=O)O.O.[Sc]

Properties
Chemical formula	C_{6}H_{9}O_{6}Sc
Molar mass	222.088 g·mol^{−1}
Appearance	white solid
- Except where otherwise noted, data are given for materials in their standard state (at 25 °C [77 °F], 100 kPa). Infobox references

Scandium acetate is a compound, with the chemical formula of Sc(CH_{3}COO)_{3}. It exists in the anhydrous and the hydrate forms. It can be obtained by reacting scandium hydroxide or scandium oxide with acetic acid. It is a colorless, water-soluble solid. It decomposes into scandium oxide at high temperature. It can be used to prepare other scandium-containing materials.

The structure of the anhydrous form was determined by X-ray crystallography. It consists of a chain of octahedral Sc(III) centers linked by bridging acetate ligands.
