= Scandium arsenate =

Names
- Other names Scandium(III) arsenate

Identifiers
CAS Number	15479-88-6; dihydrate: 32825-50-6
3D model (JSmol)	Interactive image
PubChem CID	173650500
- InChI: InChI=1S/AsH3O4.Sc/c2-1(3,4)5;/h(H3,2,3,4,5);/q;+3/p-3 Key: KEVPEIYSZRITMR-UHFFFAOYSA-K
- SMILES: [O-][As](=O)([O-])[O-].[Sc+3]

Properties
Chemical formula	ScAsO_{4}
Molar mass	183.88 g/mol
Appearance	White crystalline solid (hydrates)
Solubility in water	Sparingly soluble in water
- Except where otherwise noted, data are given for materials in their standard state (at 25 °C [77 °F], 100 kPa). Infobox references

Scandium arsenate is an inorganic compound of scandium and the arsenate ion, with the chemical formula ScAsO_{4}. It forms hydrated phases, including the well-characterized dihydrate ScAsO_{4}·2H_{2}O. The dihydrate occurs naturally as the rare mineral bonacinaite.

== Preparation ==
Scandium arsenate can be precipitated from aqueous solutions containing scandium(III) and arsenate ions.

A hydrated product can be obtained by reacting scandium nitrate with diammonium hydrogen arsenate.

The dihydrate can also be prepared by reaction of scandium hydroxide with arsenic acid at room temperature.

A hydrated phase of approximate composition ScAsO_{4}·2.5H_{2}O has been reported to precipitate from solutions over the approximate pH range 2.0–7.1.

== Properties ==
=== Hydrates and crystal structure ===
The best-characterized hydrated phase is scandium arsenate dihydrate, ScAsO_{4}·2H_{2}O.

It crystallizes in the monoclinic crystal system, space group P2_{1}/n (No. 14), with the metavariscite structure type.

For natural bonacinaite, representative single-crystal lattice parameters are a = 5.533 Å, b = 10.409 Å, c = 9.036 Å, β = 91.94° with four formula units per unit cell.

Its framework is built from corner-sharing AsO_{4} tetrahedra and ScO_{4}(H_{2}O)_{2} octahedra. Hydrogen bonding between coordinated water molecules and framework oxygen atoms reinforces the three-dimensional structure.

The ideal dihydrate is isostructural with other members of the metavariscite group.

=== Natural occurrence ===
ScAsO_{4}·2H_{2}O occurs naturally as bonacinaite, the first known scandium arsenate mineral.

The mineral was discovered at the Varenche Mine in the Aosta Valley, Italy, where it occurs as a low-temperature hydrothermal mineral. It forms colorless to faintly violet, transparent crystals and has a calculated density of about 2.82 g/cm^{3}.

Natural bonacinaite commonly contains partial substitution of Al for Sc and P for As; its ideal end-member formula is nevertheless ScAsO_{4}·2H_{2}O.

=== Thermal behaviour ===
Hydrated scandium arsenate loses water stepwise on heating.

The approximately 2.5-hydrate loses about half a water molecule between roughly 50 and 130 °C to form ScAsO_{4}·2H_{2}O.

Further dehydration occurs between approximately 250 and 370 °C, ultimately giving anhydrous ScAsO_{4}.

Earlier comparative work found the dihydrate to be isomorphous with scandium phosphate dihydrate and somewhat more soluble and less thermally stable than the corresponding phosphate.

=== Solubility ===
Scandium arsenate is very sparingly soluble in water.

A concentration-based solubility-product value of pK_{sp,c} = 26.72 ± 0.27 has been reported.
