= Lanthanum tetraboride =

Identifiers
CAS Number	12007-73-7
3D model (JSmol)	Interactive image
- InChI: InChI=1S/4B.La Key: BFNMSZFVLGAXRT-UHFFFAOYSA-N
- SMILES: [B].[B].[B].[B].[La]

Properties
Chemical formula	B_{4}La
Molar mass	182.15 g·mol^{−1}
Appearance	gray to black crystalline solid
Density	5.396 g/cm^{3}
Melting point	2,210 °C (4,010 °F; 2,480 K)

Structure
Crystal structure	tetragonal
Space group	P4/mbm
Lattice constant	a = 7.324 Å, b = 7.324 Å, c = 4.181 Å
Formula units (Z)	4 units per cell
- Except where otherwise noted, data are given for materials in their standard state (at 25 °C [77 °F], 100 kPa). Infobox references

Lanthanum tetraboride is a binary inorganic compound of lanthanum and boron with the chemical formula LaB_{4}. The compound forms a gray to black crystalline solid and demonstrates metallic conductivity.

== Properties ==
Lanthanum tetraboride is a refractory, high-hardness inorganic compound crystallizing in the tetragonal crystal system, space group P4/mbm. The arrangement of atoms is the same as in the tetraborides of cerium, thorium and uranium (CeB_{4}, ThB_{4}, UB_{4}) LaB_{4} is distinct from the more common lanthanum hexaboride LaB_{6} but shares high-temperature stability, with its boron sublattices containing structural elements of both diborides and hexaborides. The compound undergoes a series of phase transitions under high pressure.

== Synthesis ==
Lanthanum tetraboride can be prepared by the reduction of lanthanum oxide by boron carbide under vacuum:

La_{2}O_{3} + 2 B_{4}C + С → 2 LaB_{4} + 3 CO

Another method involves heating lanthanum metal and boron at 1300 °C under vacuum.

== Uses ==
The compound is generally a subject of materials science research. Also it is especially suitable for high-temperature applications.
