= Cerium hexaboride =

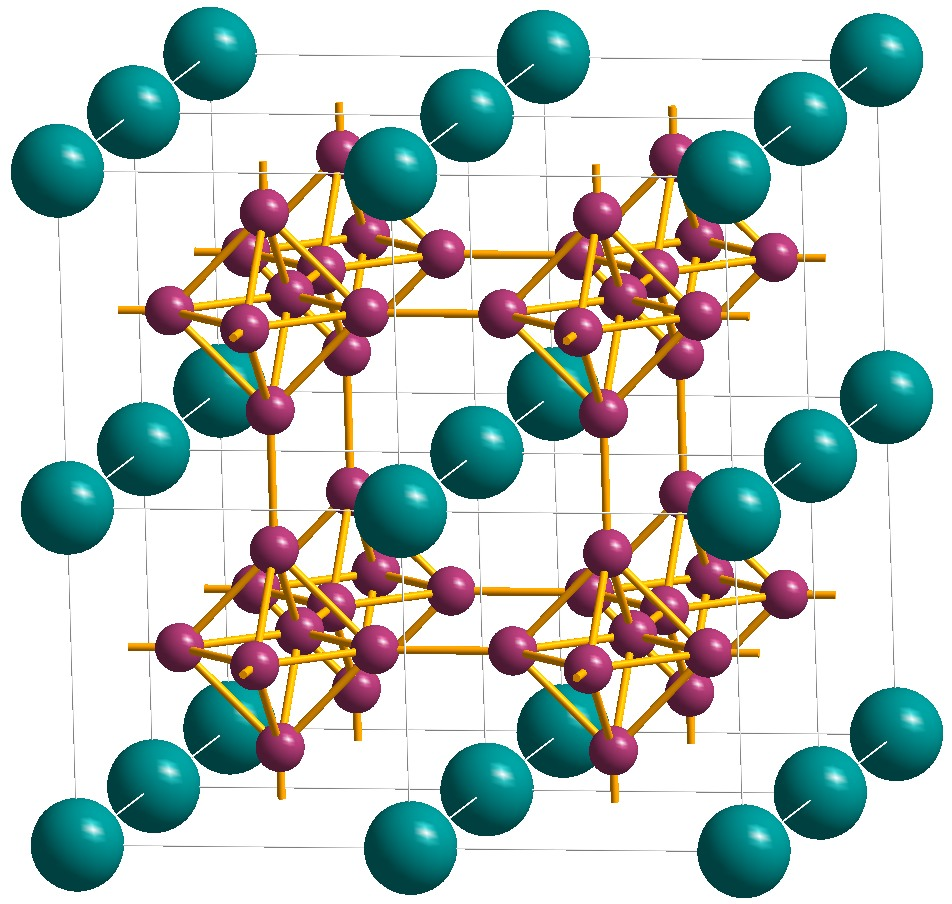

Names
- Other names cerium boride, ceBIX, CEBIX

Identifiers
CAS Number	12008-02-5
ChemSpider	52563847
ECHA InfoCard	100.031.375
EC Number	234-526-9
PubChem CID	92043601
CompTox Dashboard (EPA)	DTXSID201010266
- InChI: InChI=1/B6.Ce/c1-2-3(1)5(1)4(1,2)6(2,3)5;/q-2;+2 Key: ZGHZTPLLUUXCPI-UHFFFAOYNA-N

Properties
Chemical formula	CeB_{6}
Molar mass	204.986 g/mol
Density	4.80 g/cm^{3}
Melting point	2,552 °C; 4,625 °F; 2,825 K
Solubility in water	insoluble

Structure
Crystal structure	Cubic
Space group	Pm3̅m ; O_{h}
- Except where otherwise noted, data are given for materials in their standard state (at 25 °C [77 °F], 100 kPa). verify (what is ?) Infobox references

Cerium hexaboride (CeB_{6}, also called cerium boride, CeBix, CEBIX, and (incorrectly) CeB) is an inorganic chemical, a boride of cerium. It is a refractory ceramic material. It has a low work function, one of the highest electron emissivities known, and is stable in vacuum. The principal use of cerium hexaboride is a coating of hot cathodes. It usually operates at temperature of 1450 °C.

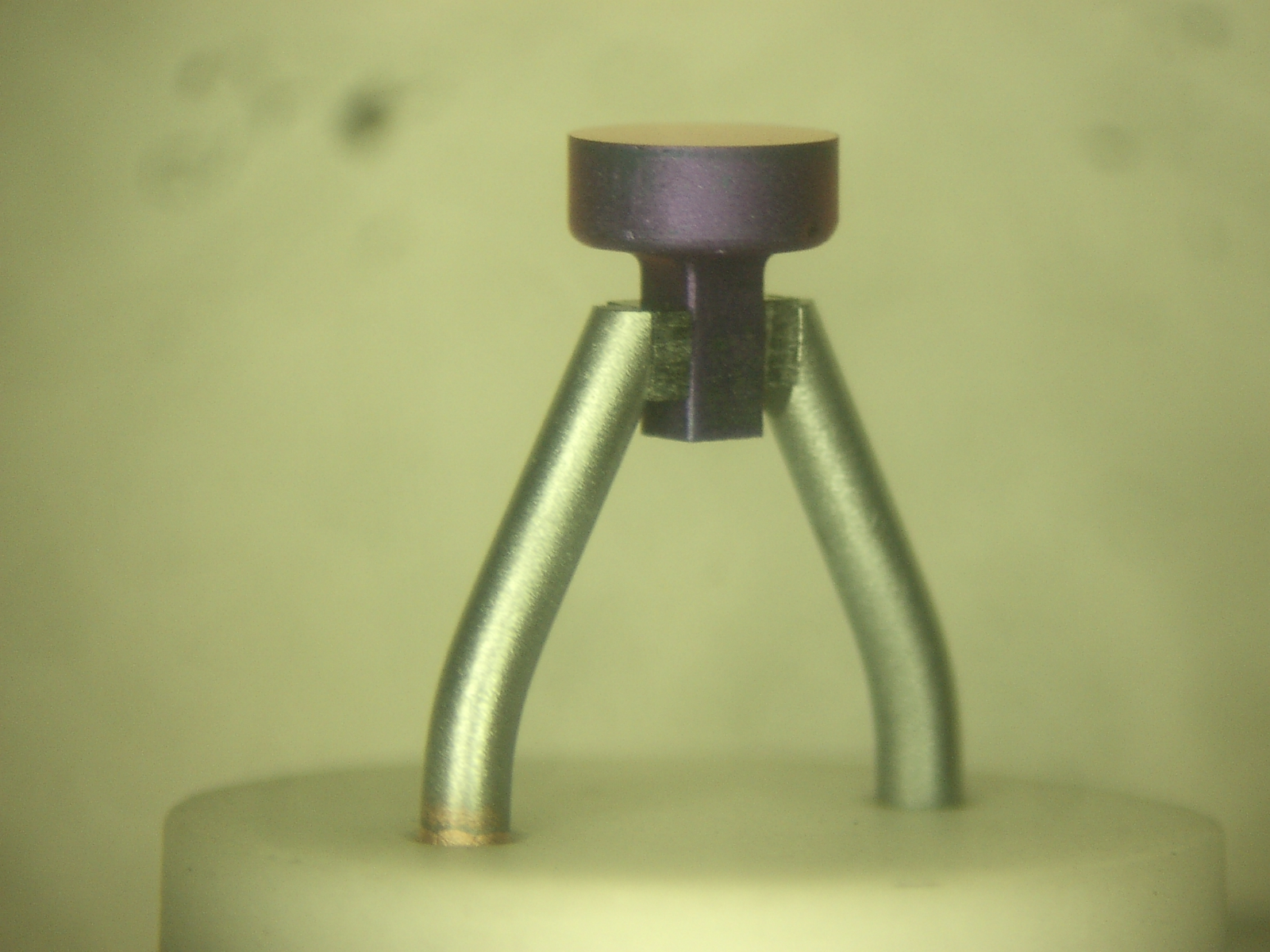
A cerium hexaboride top hat cathode.

== Applications ==
Lanthanum hexaboride (LaB_{6}) and cerium hexaboride (CeB_{6}) are used as coating of some high-current hot cathodes. Hexaborides show low work function, around 2.5 eV. They are also somewhat resistant to cathode poisoning. Cerium boride cathodes show lower evaporation rate at 1700 K than lanthanum boride, but it becomes equal at 1850 K and higher above that. Cerium boride cathodes have one and half the lifetime of lanthanum boride, due to its higher resistance to carbon contamination. Boride cathodes are about ten times as "bright" than the tungsten ones and have 10–15 times longer lifetime. In some laboratory tests, CeB_{6} has proven to be more resistant to the negative impact of carbon contamination than LaB_{6}. They are used e.g. in electron microscopes, microwave tubes, electron lithography, electron beam welding, X-Ray tubes, and free electron lasers.

Cerium Hexaboride is also investigated for use in radiation detection devices due to its efficiency in detecting photon radiation. Research indicates that a three-layer sensor configuration, incorporating CeB_{6}, can outperform single-layer designs in terms of energy resolution and counting rate.

Cerium hexaboride, like lanthanum hexaboride, slowly evaporates during cathode operation. In conditions where CeB_{6} cathodes are operated below 1850 K, CeB_{6} should maintain its optimum shape longer and therefore last longer. While the process is about 30% slower than with lanthanum boride, the cerium boride deposits are reported to be more difficult to remove.

Ce heavy fermion compounds have attracted much attention since they show a variety of unusual and interesting macroscopic properties. In particular, interest has been focused on the 4f narrow-band occupancy, and the role of hybridization with the conduction band states which strongly affects the physical properties.
