= Lutetium(III) hydroxide =

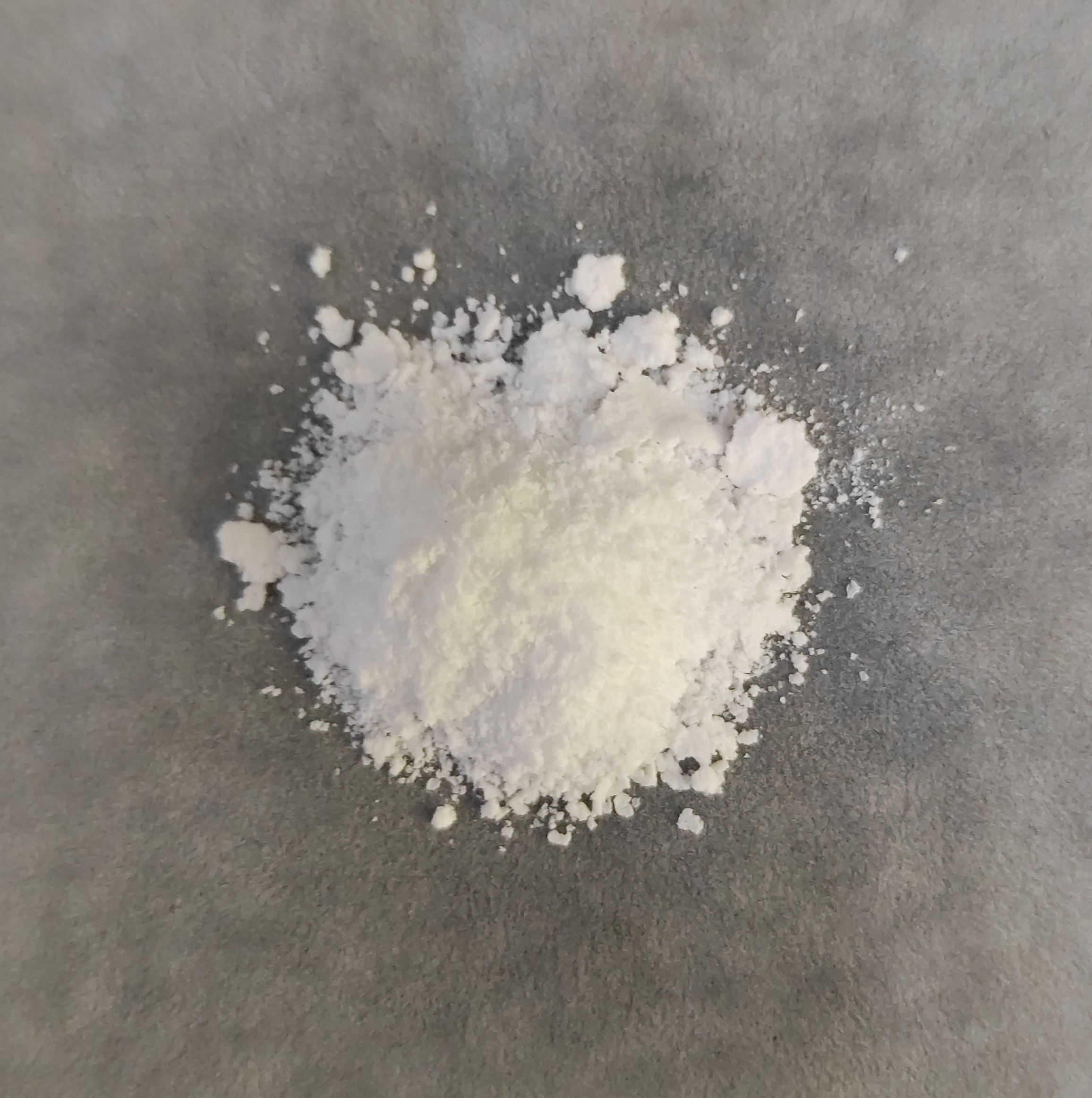
- Lutetium(III) hydroxide

Identifiers
CAS Number	16469-21-9
3D model (JSmol)	Interactive image
ChemSpider	77051
ECHA InfoCard	100.036.820
EC Number	240-519-1
PubChem CID	85437
CompTox Dashboard (EPA)	DTXSID90936980
- InChI: InChI=1S/Lu.3H2O/h;3*1H2/q+3;;;/p-3 Key: QVVDHJQBGNVGEB-UHFFFAOYSA-K
- SMILES: [Lu+3].[OH-].[OH-].[OH-]

Properties
Chemical formula	Lu(OH)_{3}
Molar mass	225.991
Appearance	white solid

Related compounds
Other anions	lutetium oxide
Other cations	Scandium(III) hydroxide Yttrium(III) hydroxide
- Except where otherwise noted, data are given for materials in their standard state (at 25 °C [77 °F], 100 kPa). Infobox references

Lutetium(III) hydroxide is an inorganic compound with the chemical formula Lu(OH)_{3}.

== Production ==
Reacting lutetium chloride and alkalis will first produce Lu(OH)_{2}Cl, then it will become Lu(OH)_{2.5}Cl_{0.5}. Finally, the reaction will produce Lu(OH)_{3}.

LuCl_{3}+2 NaOH→Lu(OH)_{2}Cl+2 NaCl
Lu(OH)_{2}Cl+0.5 NaOH→Lu(OH)_{2.5}Cl_{0.5}+0.5 NaCl
Lu(OH)_{2.5}Cl_{0.5}+0.5 NaOH→Lu(OH)_{3}+0.5 NaCl

== Chemical properties ==
Lutetium(III) hydroxide can react with acid and form lutetium(III) salts：

Lu(OH)_{3} + 3 H^{+} → Lu^{3+} + 3 H_{2}O

While heating lutetium(III) hydroxide, it will produce LuO(OH), continued heating could produce Lu_{2}O_{3}.
