= Lanthanum pentanickel =

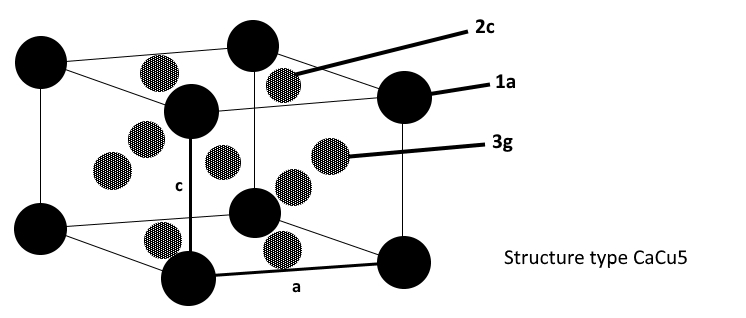

Names
- IUPAC name lanthane nickel

Identifiers
CAS Number	12196-72-4
3D model (JSmol)	Interactive image
ChemSpider	145836
ECHA InfoCard	100.032.144
EC Number	235-372-5
PubChem CID	166660
CompTox Dashboard (EPA)	DTXSID80276564
- InChI: InChI=1S/La.5Ni Key: BUCVQDCWULHLJZ-UHFFFAOYSA-N
- SMILES: [Ni].[Ni].[Ni].[Ni].[Ni].[La]

Properties
Chemical formula	LaNi_{5}
Molar mass	432.3725 g·mol^{−1}
Appearance	Silvey-grey powder
Density	7.950
Solubility in water	non-soluble

Structure
Crystal structure	hexagonal
Space group	P6/mmm

Hazards
- GHS labelling
Pictograms	(GHS02: Flammable) (GHS07: Exclamation mark) (GHS08: Health hazard)
Signal word	Danger
Hazard statements	H228, H317, H350
Precautionary statements	P203, P210, P240, P241, P261, P272, P280, P302+P352, P318, P321, P333+P313, P362+P364, P370+P378, P405, P501
- Except where otherwise noted, data are given for materials in their standard state (at 25 °C [77 °F], 100 kPa). Infobox references

LaNi_{5} is a hexagonal intermetallic compound composed of the rare earth element lanthanum and the transition metal nickel. It presents a calcium pentacopper (CaCu_{5}) crystal structure. It is a melting compound with the same composition and has hydrogen storage capacity.

== Structure ==
LaNi_{5} has a calcium pentacopper (CaCu_{5}) type crystal structure, with a hexagonal lattice, space group is P6/mmm (No. 191), with lanthanum atom is located at coordinate origin 1a (0,0,0), two nickel atoms are located at 2c (1/ 3,2/3,0) and (2/3,1/3,0), the other three at 3g (1/2,0,1/2), (0,1/2,1/2), (1/2,1/2,1/2), with a=511pm, c=397pm. The unit cell contains 1 LaNi_{5} atom, the volume is 90×10^{−24} cm^{3}, the LaNi_{5} unit cell contains a larger The six deformed tetrahedral voids can be used to fill in hydrogen atoms.

== Chemical reactions ==
As a hydrogen storage alloy, LaNi_{5} can absorb hydrogen to form the hydride LaNi_{5}H_{x} (x≈6) when the pressure is slightly high and the temperature is low, or when the pressure decreases or the temperature increases, hydrogen can be released to form repeated absorption and release of hydrogen. Energy must be added for the dehydrogenation process to proceed as it is an endothermic reaction. A decrease in temperature will cause the reaction to stop.

== Characteristics and applications ==
The hydrogen storage density per unit volume (crystal) of LaNi_{5}H_{6.5} at 2 bar is equal to the density of gaseous molecular hydrogen at 1800 bar, and all hydrogen can be desorbed at 2 bar. Although the hydrogen storage density in practical applications is reduced due to the aggregation of some LaNi_{5} powders, it is still higher than the density of liquid hydrogen. This allows safe operation of hydrogen fuel. In order to improve its hydrogen storage performance, metals such as lead or manganese are often used to partially replace nickel. Currently, LaNi_{5} is commonly used in storage and transportation of hydrogen, hydrogen vehicle power, fuel cells, separation and purification of hydrogen, propylene hydrogenation catalysts, etc.
