= Yttrium compounds =

Chemical substances containing yttrium

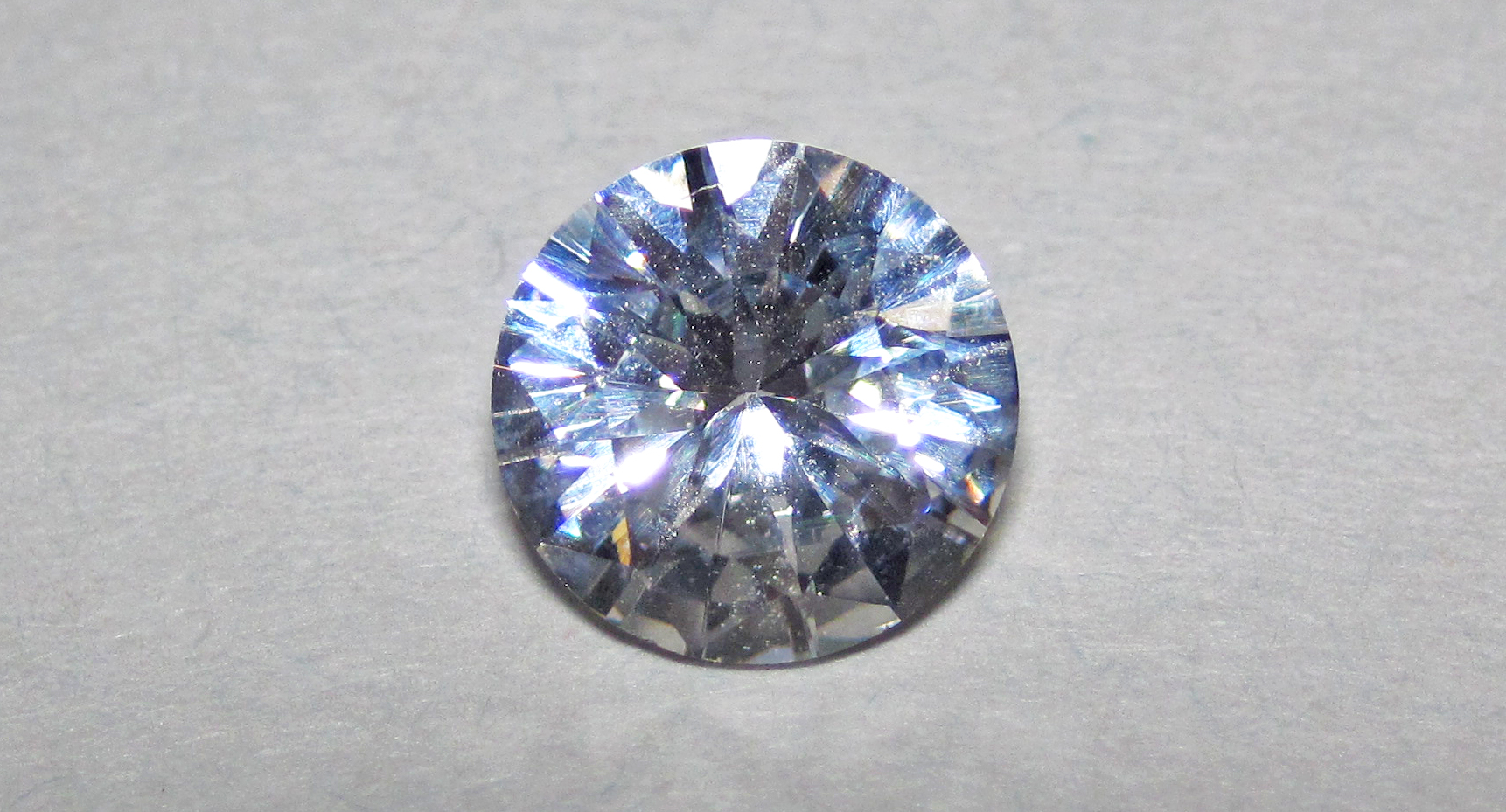
A sample of yttrium aluminium garnet, a compound of yttrium

An yttrium compound is a chemical compound containing yttrium (element symbol: Y). Among these compounds, yttrium generally has a +3 valence. The solubility properties of yttrium compounds are similar to those of the lanthanides. For example oxalates and carbonates are hardly soluble in water, but soluble in excess oxalate or carbonate solutions as complexes are formed. Sulfates and double sulfates are generally soluble. They resemble the "yttrium group" of heavy lanthanide elements.

== Chalcogenides ==
The oxides and hydroxides of yttrium are yttrium oxide (Y_{2}O_{3}) and yttrium hydroxide (Y(OH)_{3}), respectively, and they are both white solids which are hardly soluble in water. Among them, yttrium oxide can be prepared by heating yttrium carbonate or yttrium oxalate. Alternatively the oxychloride, Y_{3}O_{4}Cl can be heated in air to yield the oxide.

Yttrium hydroxide can be precipitated by the reaction of soluble yttrium compounds with sodium hydroxide or ammonia, and can also be obtained by the hydrolysis of yttrium alkoxide. Hydroxy acids and sugars present in the solution will prevent the formation of precipitates due to the formation of stable coordination compounds. Yttrium hydroxide can be decomposed by heating. Firstly, basic yttrium oxide (YO(OH)) is formed, and when heating is continued yttrium oxide is obtained. Both yttrium oxide and yttrium hydroxide are easily soluble in strong acids to form corresponding yttrium salts.

Yttrium chalcogenides Y_{2}S_{3}, Y_{2}Se_{3}, and Y_{2}Te_{3} are known. They can be obtained by the direct combination of elementary substances or anhydrous chlorine. The reaction of compounds with chalcogenide gives: [9]

Y_{2}O_{3} + 3 H_{2}E → Y_{2}E_{3} + 3 H_{2}O
2 Y + 3 E → Y_{2}E_{3} (E = S, Se, Te)

== Halides ==
Yttrium halides can be obtained by reacting yttrium oxide, yttrium hydroxide or yttrium carbonate with the corresponding hydrohalic acid solution. For yttrium chloride (YCl_{3}) and yttrium bromide (YBr_{3}), the yttrium halide hydrate can be precipitated by cooling their saturated solution or by passing in the corresponding hydrogen halide. Yttrium halides, like lanthanide metal halides, cannot be obtained by direct heating of the hydrate, otherwise yttrium oxyhalide (YOX) will be formed. Anhydous compounds can be obtained by heating the hydrate in a hydrogen halide stream, or by treating it with ammonium halide and sulfoxide. [10] In addition to forming hydrates (YF_{3} · 1 / 2H_{2}O, YCl_{3} · 6H_{2}O, YBr_{3}·6H_{2}O, and YI_{3}·8H_{2}O), yttrium halides can also form complexes with some ligands. Substances, such as [Y(Me_{3}PO)_{6}]X_{3} or [Y(Me_{3}AsO)_{6}]X_{3} (X = Cl, Br, I) and the like with phosphine oxides. [11] Yttrium and halogens (except fluorine [12] ) or pseudohalogens can also form complexes, such as Cs_{3}[Y_{2}I_{9}], (Bu_{4}N)_{3} [Y(NCS)_{6} ], etc.

The reaction of yttrium metal with yttrium chloride or yttrium bromide yields low-oxidation monohalides YX and yttrium sesquichloride Y_{2}Cl_{3}, and sesquibromide Y_{2}Br_{3} (X = Cl, Br).

== Oxoacid salts ==
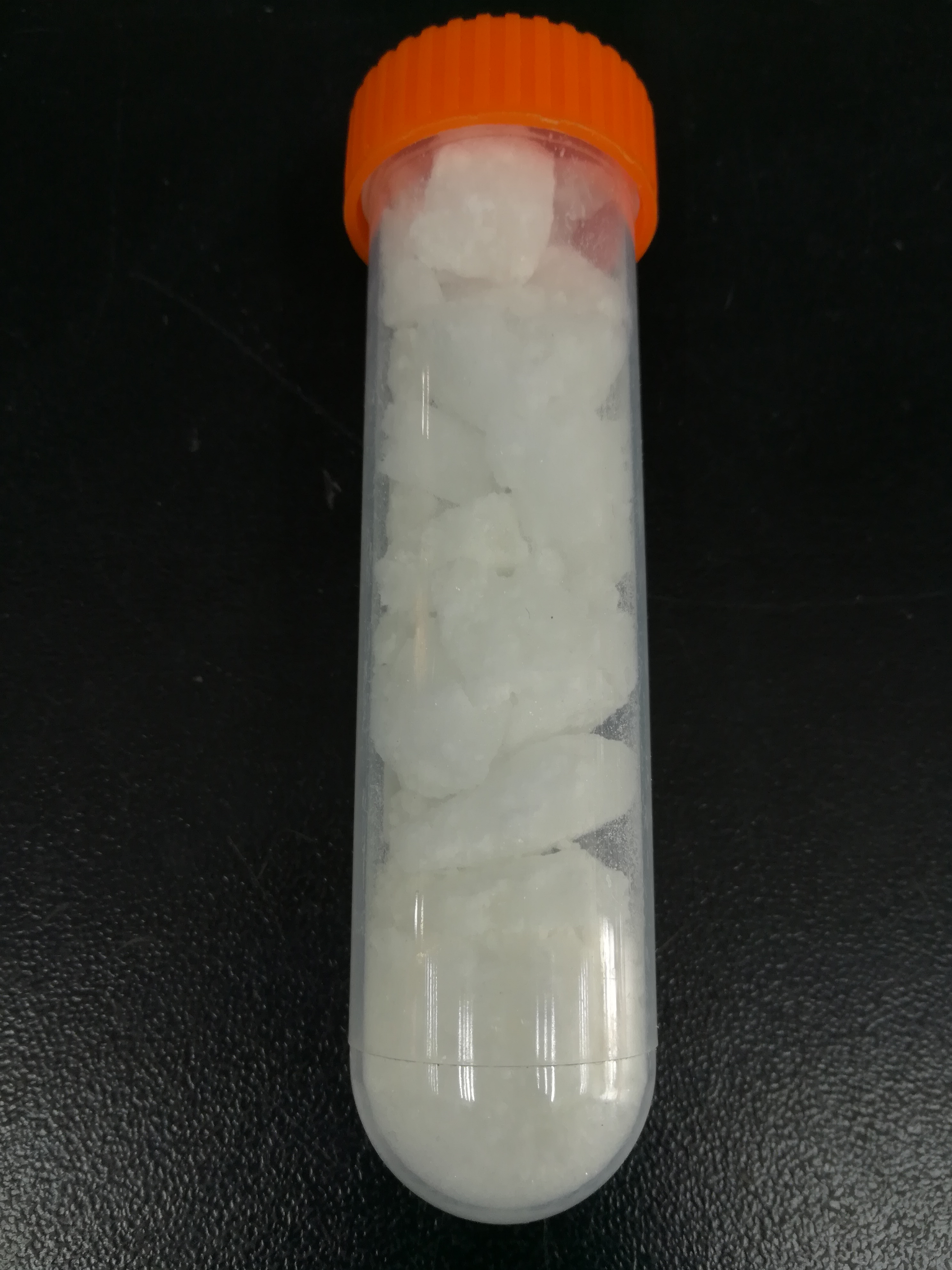
Yttrium nitrate

Most of the salts from strong acids are soluble in water. The ionic radius (0.900) of yttrium in [Y(H_{2}O)_{6}]^{3+} is similar to that of holmium [Ho(H_{2}O)_{6}]^{3+} (0.901), and differs from easily hydrolyzed [Sc(H_{2}O)_{6}]^{3+}.

Yttrium carbonate and yttrium oxalate are sparingly soluble in water, but are dissolved in acid. They decompose on heating to yttrium oxide.

== Organic acid salts ==
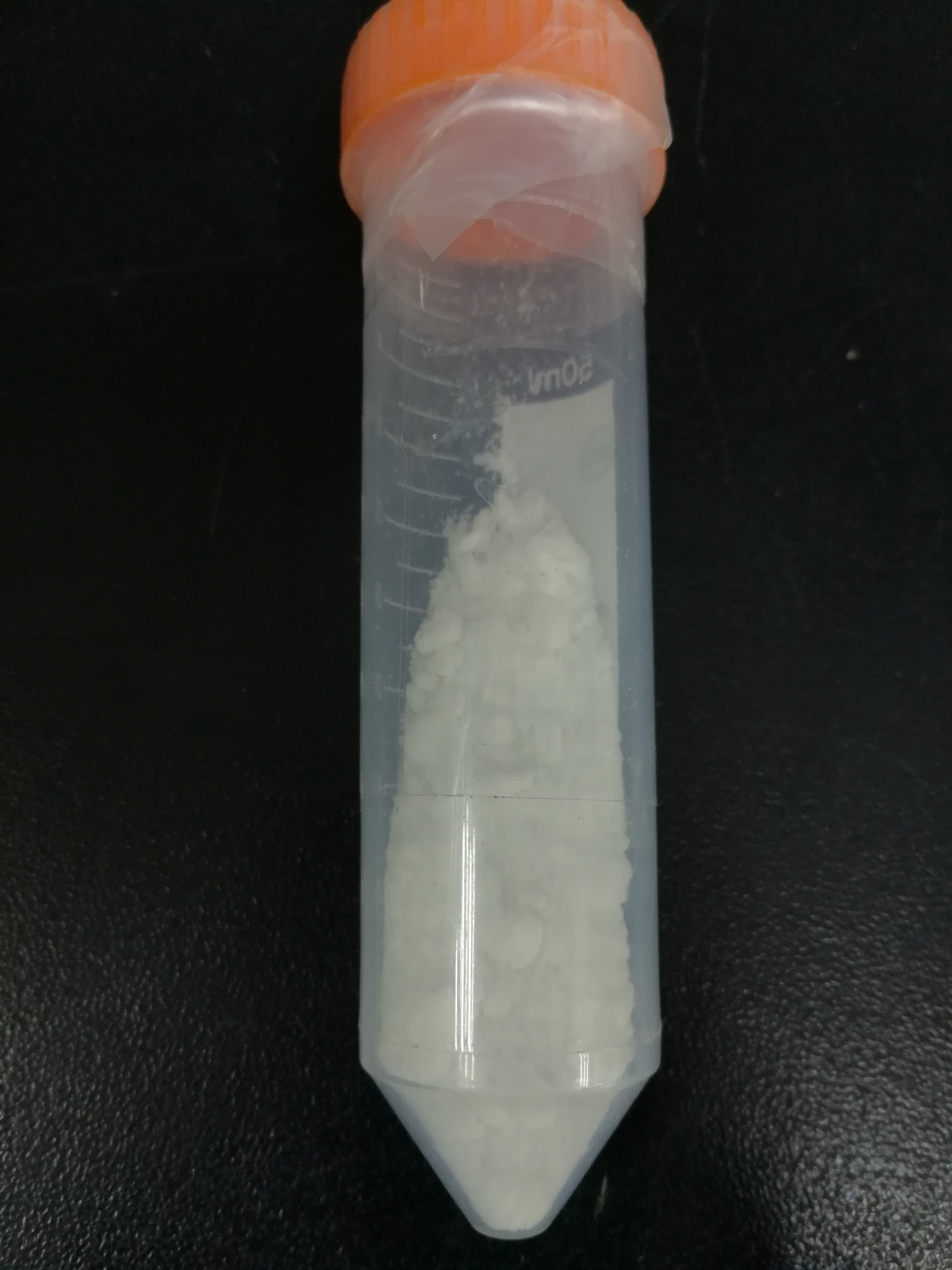
Yttrium acetate

Organic acid salts of yttrium include yttrium formate, yttrium acetate, yttrium propionate, yttrium butyrate. They are all made by dissolving the carbonate or oxide in the corresponding acid. Aromatic polycarboxylates like phthalic acid or trimellitic acid have a rigid shape, and can coordinate more than one yttrium atom to form a metal-organic framework compound.

== Binary compounds ==
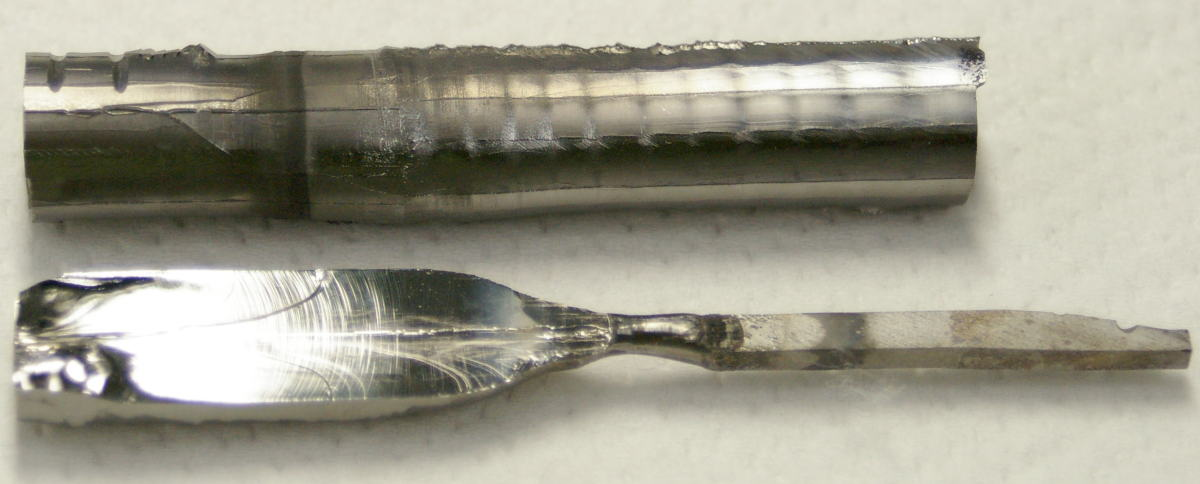
YB_{66} grown by zone melting

Two yttrium hydrides are known at standard conditions, YH_{2} and YH_{3}. YH_{9}, a polyhydride is stable at high pressures, and is a superconductor at temperatures up to 243K.

Yttrium and pnictides can form compounds with the chemical formula YE (E = N, P, As, Sb). They can be hydrolyzed in humid air and emit volatile hydrides EH_{3}.

Yttrium and carbon can form a variety of compounds, such as Y_{2}C_{3}, YC_{2}. They can be made in several ways:

2 Y + 3 C → Y_{2}C_{3}
Y_{2}O_{3} + 7 C → 2 YC_{2} + 3 CO ↑

There are also several yttrium silicides, such as YSi_{2}, Y_{5}Si_{4} and YSi; and several stannides.

Yttrium and boron can also form many colourful compounds, such as gold YB_{4} , blue YB_{6} , light blue YB_{12}. They are metallic; YB_{66} is a semiconductor, and the resistivity at room temperature is 10^{6} Ω·cm.

== See also ==
- Category:Yttrium minerals
