= Lanthanum hexaboride =

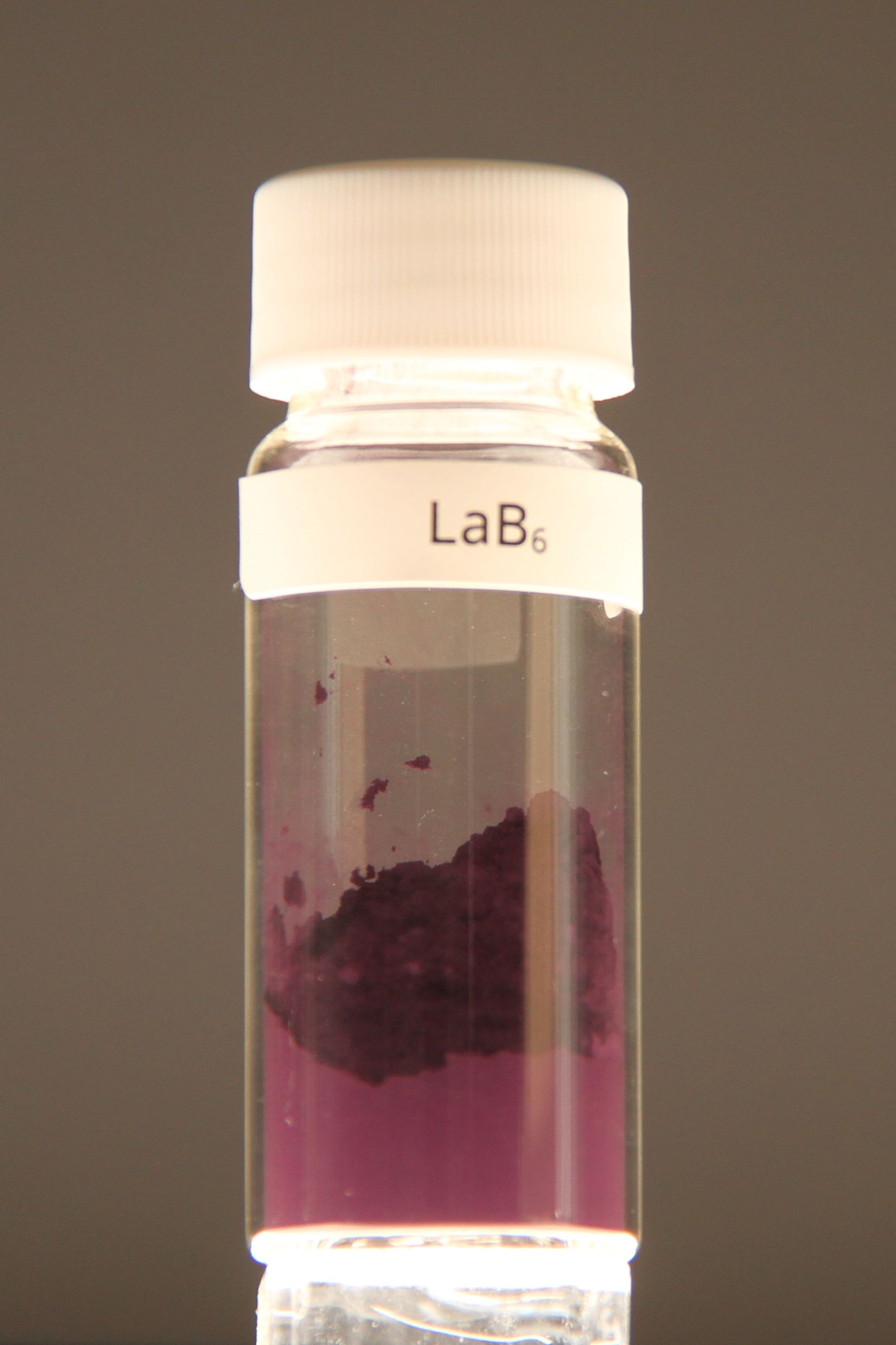

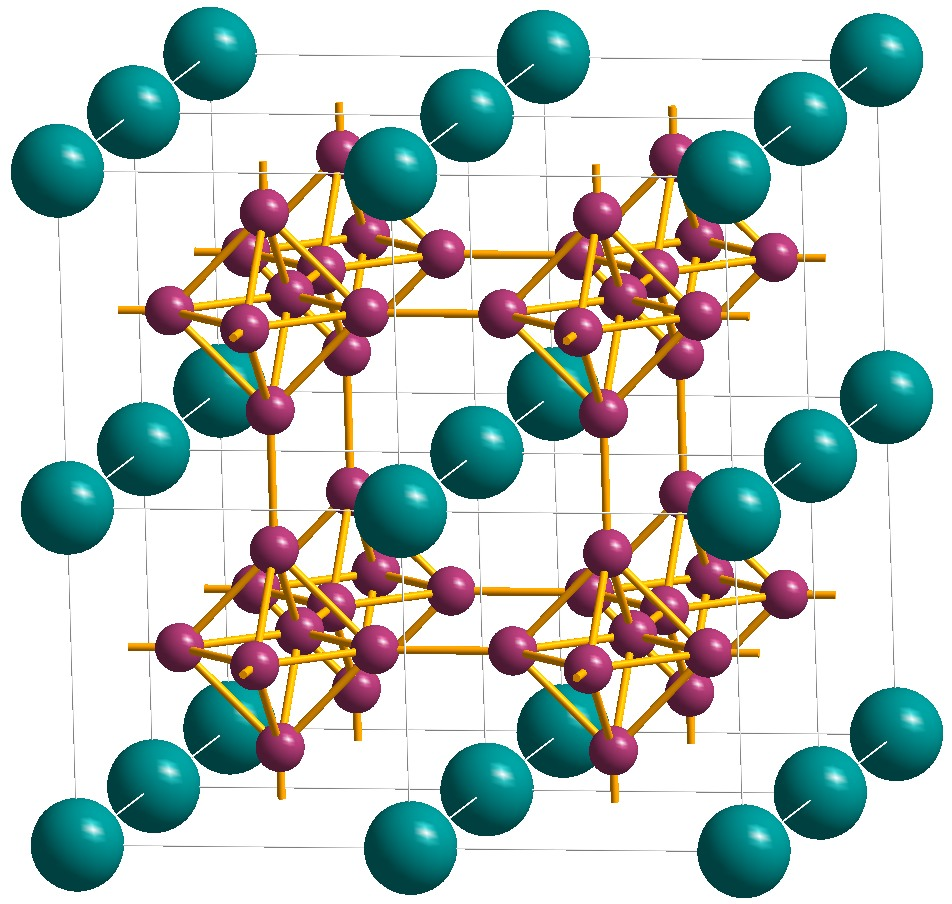

Names
- Other names Lanthanum boride

Identifiers
CAS Number	12008-21-8
ChemSpider	21241507
ECHA InfoCard	100.031.379
EC Number	234-531-6
PubChem CID	71308229
CompTox Dashboard (EPA)	DTXSID601010268
- InChI: InChI=1S/B6.La/c1-2-5(1)3-4(5)6(1,2)3;/q-2;+2 Key: VJXOKIULCJPJLW-UHFFFAOYSA-N

Properties
Chemical formula	LaB_{6}
Molar mass	203.78 g/mol
Appearance	intense purple violet
Density	4.72 g/cm^{3}
Melting point	2,210 °C (4,010 °F; 2,480 K)
Solubility in water	insoluble

Structure
Crystal structure	Cubic
Space group	Pm3̅m ; O_{h}
- Except where otherwise noted, data are given for materials in their standard state (at 25 °C [77 °F], 100 kPa). verify (what is ?) Infobox references

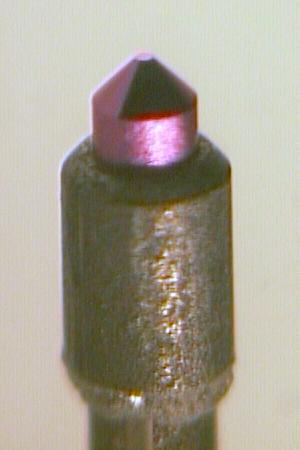
A lanthanum hexaboride hot cathode.

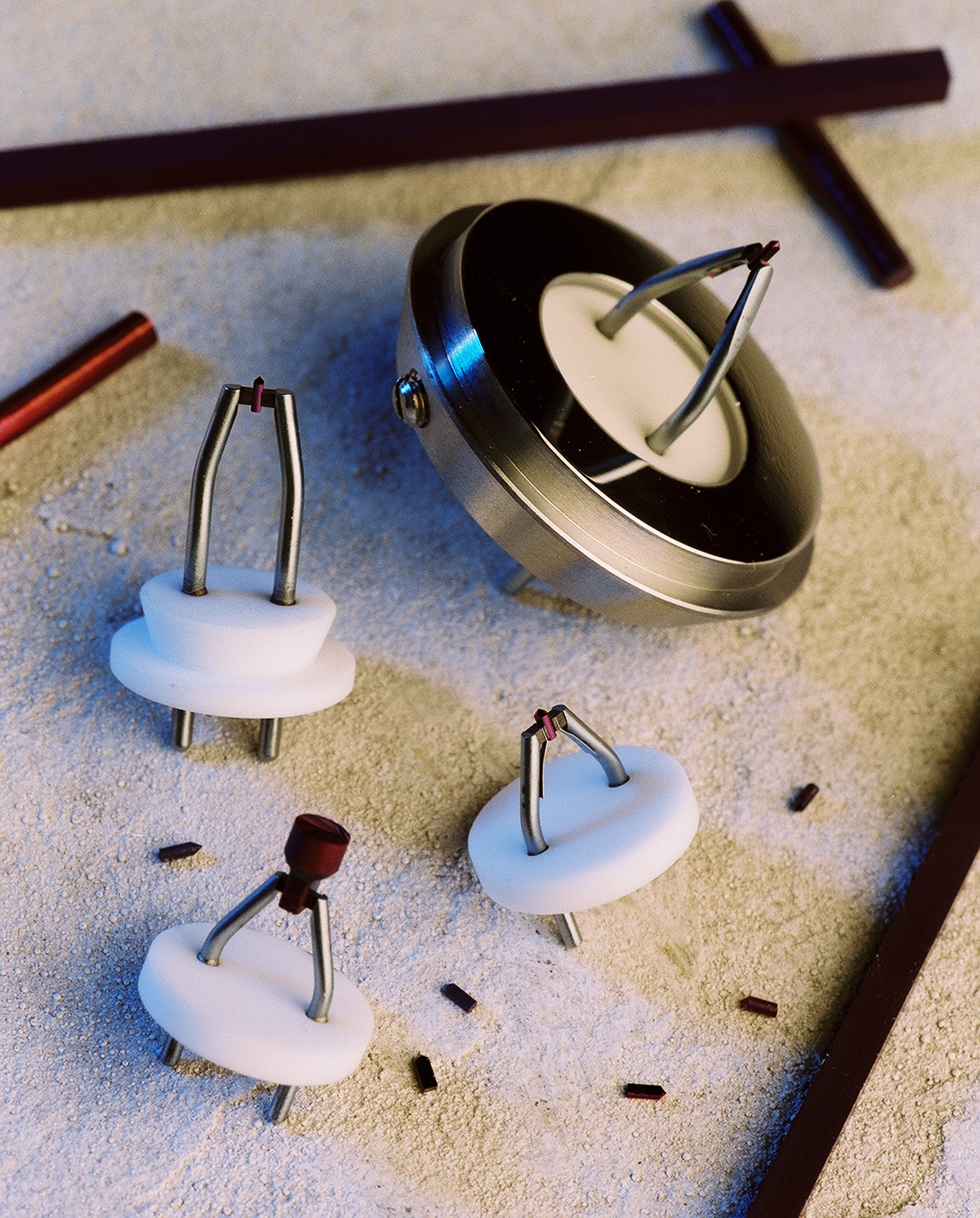
Lanthanum hexaboride cathodes.

Lanthanum hexaboride (LaB_{6}, also called lanthanum boride and LaB) is an inorganic chemical, a boride of lanthanum. It is a refractory ceramic material that has a melting point of 2210 °C, and is insoluble in water and hydrochloric acid. It is extremely hard, with a Mohs hardness of 9.5. It has a low work function and one of the highest electron emissivities known, and is stable in vacuum. Stoichiometric samples are colored intense purple-violet, while boron-rich ones (above LaB_{6.07}) are blue. Ion bombardment changes its color from purple to emerald green. LaB_{6} is a superconductor with a relatively low transition temperature of 0.45 K.

== Uses ==
=== Electron Sources ===
The principal use of lanthanum hexaboride is in hot cathodes, either as a single crystal or as a coating deposited by physical vapor deposition. Hexaborides, such as lanthanum hexaboride (LaB_{6}) and cerium hexaboride (CeB_{6}), have low work functions, around 2.5 eV. They are also somewhat resistant to cathode poisoning. Cerium hexaboride cathodes have a lower evaporation rate at 1700 K than lanthanum hexaboride, but they become equal at temperatures above 1850 K. Cerium hexaboride cathodes have one and half the lifetime of lanthanum hexaboride, due to the former's higher resistance to carbon contamination. Hexaboride cathodes are about ten times "brighter" than tungsten cathodes, and have 10–15 times longer lifetime. Devices and techniques in which hexaboride cathodes are used include electron microscopes, microwave tubes, electron lithography, electron beam welding, X-ray tubes, free electron lasers and several types of electric propulsion technologies. Lanthanum hexaboride slowly evaporates from the heated cathodes and forms deposits on the Wehnelt cylinders and apertures.

=== X-Ray Diffraction Reference ===
LaB_{6} is also used as an X-ray powder diffraction (XRD or pXRD) peak position and line shape reference standard. It is therefore used to calibrate measured diffractometer angles and to determine instrumental broadening of diffraction peaks. The latter makes crystallite size and strain measurements by XRD possible.
