= Lanthanum hydroxide =

Lanthanum(III) hydroxide
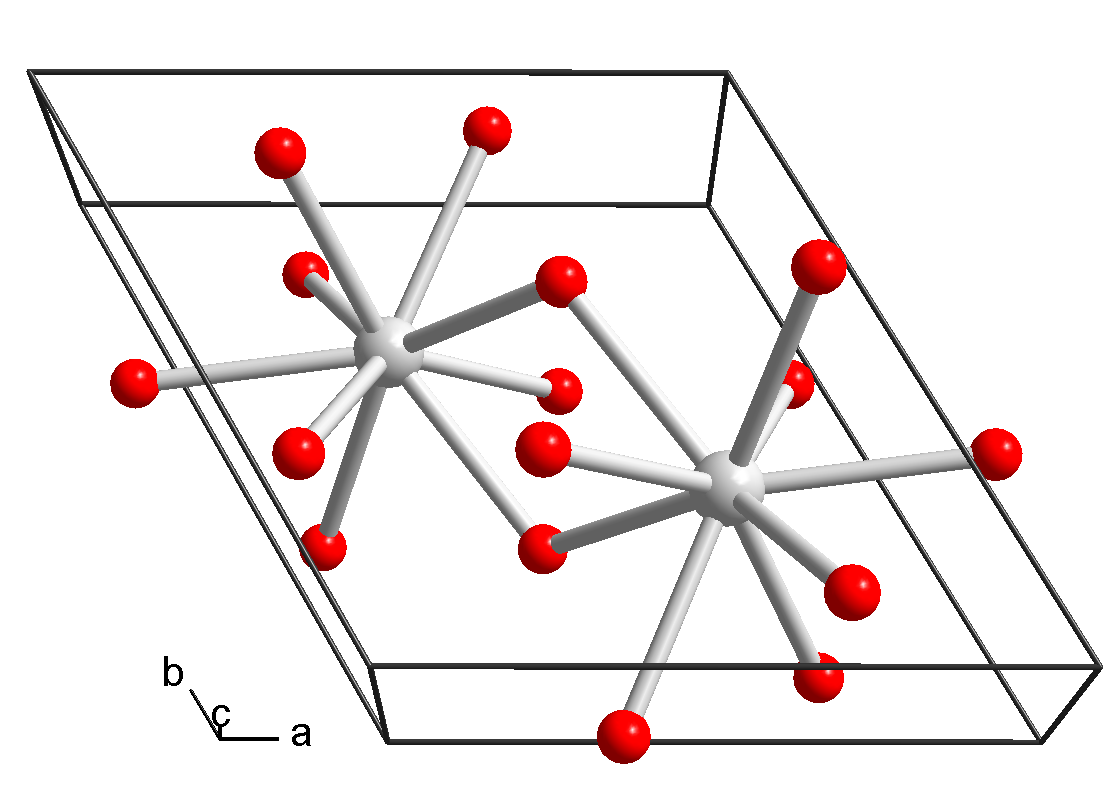
- __ La^{3+} __ OH^{−}

Names
- IUPAC name Lanthanum(III) hydroxide

Identifiers
CAS Number	14507-19-8
3D model (JSmol)	Interactive image
ChemSpider	119053
ECHA InfoCard	100.034.994
EC Number	238-510-2
PubChem CID	135111
UNII	7PTY21U5YN
CompTox Dashboard (EPA)	DTXSID5065778
- InChI: InChI=1S/La.3H2O/h;3*1H2 Key: YXEUGTSPQFTXTR-UHFFFAOYSA-K
- SMILES: [OH-].[OH-].[OH-].[La+3]

Properties
Chemical formula	La(OH)_{3}
Molar mass	189.93 g/mol
Solubility in water	K_{sp}= 2.00·10^{−21}

Structure
Crystal structure	hexagonal
Space group	P6_{3}/m, No. 176
Lattice constant	a = 6.547 Å, c = 3.854 Å

Hazards
- Occupational safety and health (OHS/OSH)
Main hazards	Irritant
- GHS labelling
Pictograms	(GHS05: Corrosive)
Signal word	Danger
Hazard statements	H314
Precautionary statements	P260, P264, P280, P301+P330+P331, P303+P361+P353, P304+P340, P305+P351+P338, P310, P321, P363, P405, P501
NFPA 704 (fire diamond)	1 W
Flash point	Non-flammable

Related compounds
Other anions	Lanthanum(III) chloride
Other cations	Cerium(III) hydroxide Actinium(III) hydroxide
- Except where otherwise noted, data are given for materials in their standard state (at 25 °C [77 °F], 100 kPa). (what is ?) Infobox references

Lanthanum hydroxide is La(OH)_{3}, a hydroxide of the rare-earth element lanthanum.

== Synthesis ==
Lanthanum hydroxide can be obtained by adding an alkali such as ammonia to aqueous solutions of lanthanum salts such as lanthanum nitrate. This produces a gel-like precipitate that can then be dried in air.

La(NO_{3})_{3} + 3 NH_{4}OH → La(OH)_{3} + 3 NH_{4}NO_{3}

Alternatively, it can be produced by hydration reaction (addition of water) to lanthanum oxide.

La_{2}O_{3} + 3 H_{2}O → 2 La(OH)_{3}

== Characteristics ==
Lanthanum hydroxide does not react much with alkaline substances, however is slightly soluble in acidic solution. In temperatures above 330 °C it decomposes into lanthanum oxide hydroxide (LaOOH), which upon further heating decomposes into lanthanum oxide (La_{2}O_{3}):

La(OH)_{3} $\mathrm{ \xrightarrow [-H_2O]{330\ ^{o}C} \ }$ LaOOH

2 LaOOH $\mathrm{\xrightarrow [-H_2O]{\Delta} \ }$ La_{2}O_{3}

Lanthanum hydroxide crystallizes in the hexagonal crystal system. Each lanthanum ion in the crystal structure is surrounded by nine hydroxide ions in a tricapped trigonal prism.
