= Yttrium hydroxide =

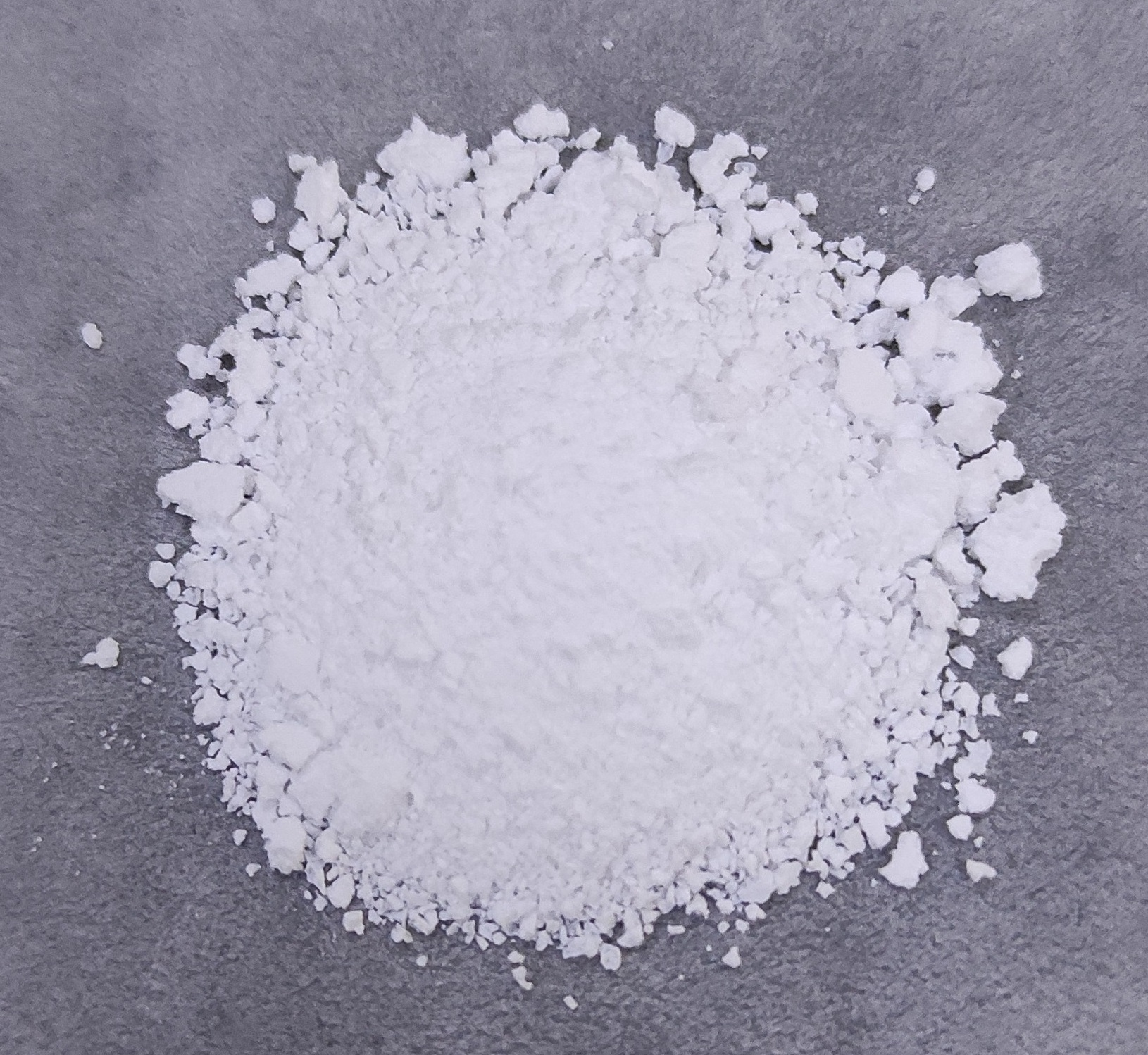

Identifiers
CAS Number	16469-22-0
3D model (JSmol)	Interactive image
ChemSpider	77052
ECHA InfoCard	100.036.821
EC Number	240-520-7
PubChem CID	85438
CompTox Dashboard (EPA)	DTXSID901014302
- InChI: InChI=1S/3H2O.Y/h3*1H2;/q;;;+3/p-3 Key: DEXZEPDUSNRVTN-UHFFFAOYSA-K
- SMILES: [OH-].[Y+3].[OH-].[OH-]

Properties
Chemical formula	Y(OH)_{3}
Appearance	white solid

Related compounds
Other anions	yttrium oxide
Other cations	scandium(III) hydroxide lutetium(III) hydroxide
- Except where otherwise noted, data are given for materials in their standard state (at 25 °C [77 °F], 100 kPa). Infobox references

Yttrium(III) hydroxide is an inorganic compound and an alkali with the chemical formula Y(OH)_{3}.

== Production ==
Yttrium(III) hydroxide can be produced by reacting yttrium(III) nitrate and sodium hydroxide in aqueous solution:

Y(NO_{3})_{3}(aq) + 3 NaOH(aq) → Y(OH)_{3}(s) + 3 NaNO_{3}(aq)

This gives yttrium(III) hydroxide as a white gelatinous precipitate, which can be dried to a white powder.

== Chemical properties ==
Yttrium(III) hydroxide is an alkali, so it can react with acid:

Y(OH)_{3} + 3 HNO_{3} → Y(NO_{3})_{3} + 3 H_{2}O

2 Y(OH)_{3} + 3 H_{2}SO_{4} → Y_{2}(SO_{4})_{3} + 3 H_{2}O

The compound absorbs atmospheric carbon dioxide.

When heated, yttrium(III) hydroxide will decompose:

2 Y(OH)_{3}(s) → Y_{2}O_{3}(s) + 3 H_{2}O(g)
