= Scandium(III) hydroxide =

Scandium hydroxide
Names
- IUPAC name Scandium(III) hydroxide

Identifiers
CAS Number	17674-34-9
3D model (JSmol)	Interactive image
ChemSpider	78687
ECHA InfoCard	100.037.855
EC Number	241-658-0
PubChem CID	87230
CompTox Dashboard (EPA)	DTXSID90938848
- InChI: InChI=1S/3H2O.Sc/h3*1H2;/q;;;+3/p-3 Key: LQPWUWOODZHKKW-UHFFFAOYSA-K
- SMILES: [Sc+3].[OH-].[OH-].[OH-]

Properties
Chemical formula	Sc(OH)_{3}
Molar mass	95.977 g·mol^{−1}
Density	2.65 g·cm^{−3}
Solubility in water	0.268 g/(100 mL)
Solubility product (K_{sp})	2.22×10^{−31}

Related compounds
Other anions	Scandium chloride Scandium fluoride Scandium nitrate
Other cations	Yttrium(III) hydroxide Lutetium(III) hydroxide
- Except where otherwise noted, data are given for materials in their standard state (at 25 °C [77 °F], 100 kPa). Infobox references

Scandium(III) hydroxide is an inorganic compound with the chemical formula Sc(OH)_{3}, the trivalent hydroxide of scandium. It is an amphoteric compound. It is slightly soluble in water, and its saturated solution (pH = 7.85) contains Sc(OH)_{3} and a small amount of Sc(OH)^{+}_{2}. The solubility of scandium(III) hydroxide in water is 0.0279 mol/L. It will convert to ScO(OH) after aging, greatly reducing the solubility (0.0008 mol/L). Scandium(III) hydroxide can be produced by reacting scandium salts and alkali hydroxides. In the reaction, different starting ingredients can generate different intermediates such as Sc(OH)_{1.75}Cl_{1.25}, Sc(OH)_{2}NO_{3} and Sc(OH)_{2.32}(SO_{4})_{0.34}.
