= Hydrargyrum medium-arc iodide lamp =

Stage lighting lamp

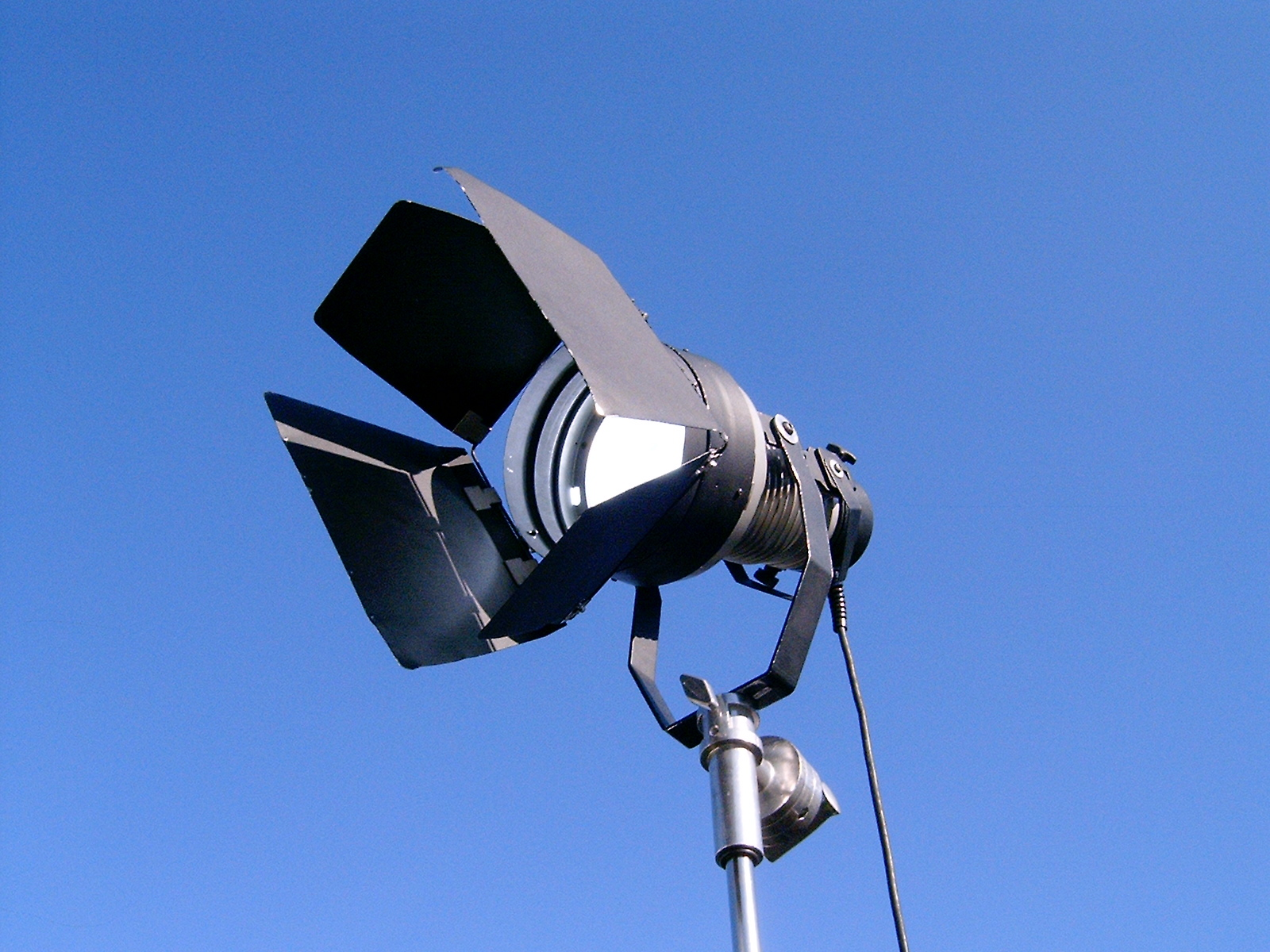
An HMI head on a stand

Hydrargyrum medium-arc iodide (HMI) is the trademark name of Osram's brand of metal-halide gas discharge medium arc-length lamp, made specifically for film and entertainment applications. Hydrargyrum comes from the Greek name for the element mercury.

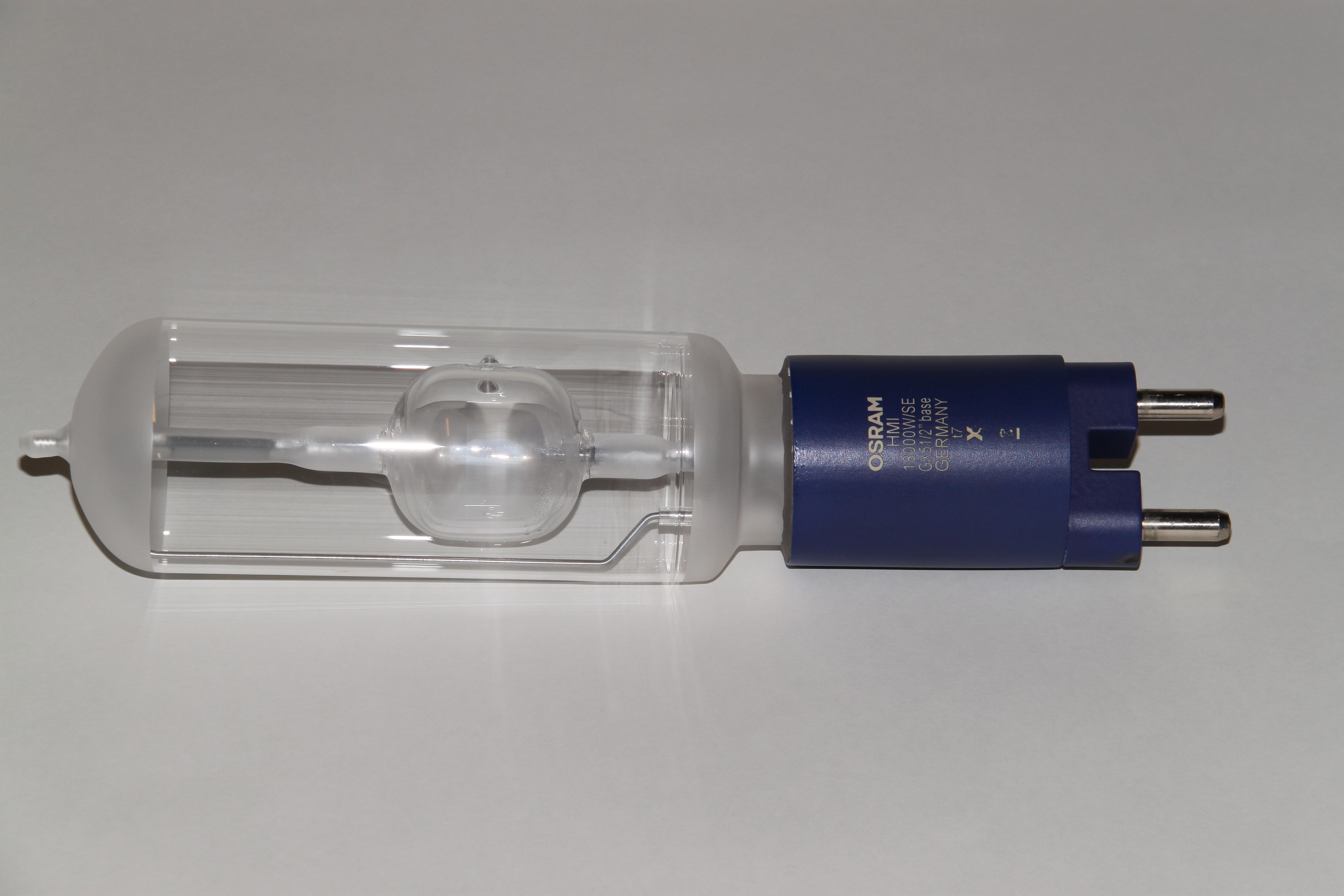
An 18 kW HMI Lamp

An HMI lamp uses mercury vapour mixed with metal halides in a quartz-glass envelope, with two tungsten electrodes of medium arc separation. Unlike traditional lighting units using incandescent light bulbs, HMIs need electrical ballasts, which are separated from the head via a header cable, to limit current and supply the proper voltage. The lamp operates by creating an electrical arc between two electrodes within the bulb that excites the pressurized mercury vapour and metal halides, and provides very high light output with greater efficiency than incandescent lighting units. The efficiency advantage is near fourfold, with approximately 85–108 lumens per watt of electricity. Unlike regular incandescent halogen lamps where a halide gas is used to regenerate the filament and keep the evaporated tungsten from darkening the glass, the mercury vapour and the metal halides in HMI lamps are what emit the light. The high color rendering index (CRI) and color temperature are due to the specific lamp chemistry.

== History ==
In the late 1960s German television producers requested lamp developer OSRAM to create a safer and cleaner replacement for carbon arc lighting used by the film industry. Osram developed and began producing HMI lamps at their request.

Philips produced a variation on the HMI, a single-ended version called MSR (medium source rare-earth). It uses a standard two-prong lampbase. To avoid the colour shift during use they added a secondary envelope around the gas-chamber. Several other bulb variations exist, including GEMI (General Electric metal iodide), CID (compact iodide daylight; Thorn EMI, UK, since 1990 GE), CSI (compact source iodine; Thorn EMI, UK), DAYMAX (made by ILC), and BRITE ARC (|[Sylvania Lighting Inc. (SLI)]). All are variations on, and different names for, essentially the same concept.

Much research was invested into making HMI lamps smaller because of their use in moving light fixtures such as those manufactured by Vari-Lite, Martin, Robe, and Highend. Philips' main contribution after this was the invention of a phosphor coating on the weld of the filament to the molybdenum foil that reduces oxidization and early failures at that point, making that area capable of withstanding extreme heat.

Multi-kilowatt HMI lights are used in the film industry and for large-screen slide projection because of their daylight-balanced light output, as well as their efficiency.

== Flicker and color temperature ==
Similar to fluorescent lights, HMIs present problems with color temperature when used for film or video lighting applications. Unlike incandescent-lighting units, which are blackbody radiators limited to a theoretical maximum of 3680 K (the melting point of tungsten), HMI lamps, like all gas discharge lighting, emit the emission spectral lines of its constituent elements, specifically chosen so that combined, they resemble the blackbody spectrum of a 6000 K source. This closely matches the color of sunlight (but not skylight), because the Sun's surface is a 6000 K blackbody radiator.

With HMI bulbs, color temperature varies significantly with lamp age. A new bulb generally will output at a color temperature close to 15,000 K during its first few hours. As the bulb ages, the color temperature reaches its nominal value of around 5600 K or 6000 K. With age, the arc length becomes larger as more of the electrodes burn away. This requires greater voltage to sustain the arc, and as voltage increases, color temperature decreases proportionately at a rate of approximately 0.5–1 kelvin for every hour burnt. For this reason, and other safety reasons, HMI bulbs are not recommended to be used past half their lifetime.

HMI bulbs (like all arc bulbs) need a current limiting unit to function. Two ways of doing this are described in the ballast section below. The problem of flickering exists only when using the bulb in combination with magnetic ballast (electronic ballasts produce flicker-free light). HMI bulbs (running with magnetic ballast) present an inherent problem of possibly producing light on film or video with a noticeable flicker. This is caused by the method by which the unit produces light. An HMI, like an incandescent lighting unit, runs on mains power, which means that the lamp cycles on and off 100 or 120 times per second (twice for every line voltage cycle). Although not visible to the human eye, a film or video camera must be properly synchronized to this cycle or each frame recorded will show different light output. Although incandescent lamps also run off mains power, they do not exhibit perceptible flicker because their filaments do not cool down enough between cycles for their light output to decrease very much. For HMI lamps, flicker can be avoided by the use of electronic ballasts that cycle at frequencies thousands of times faster than the mains frequency.

== Ballast operation ==
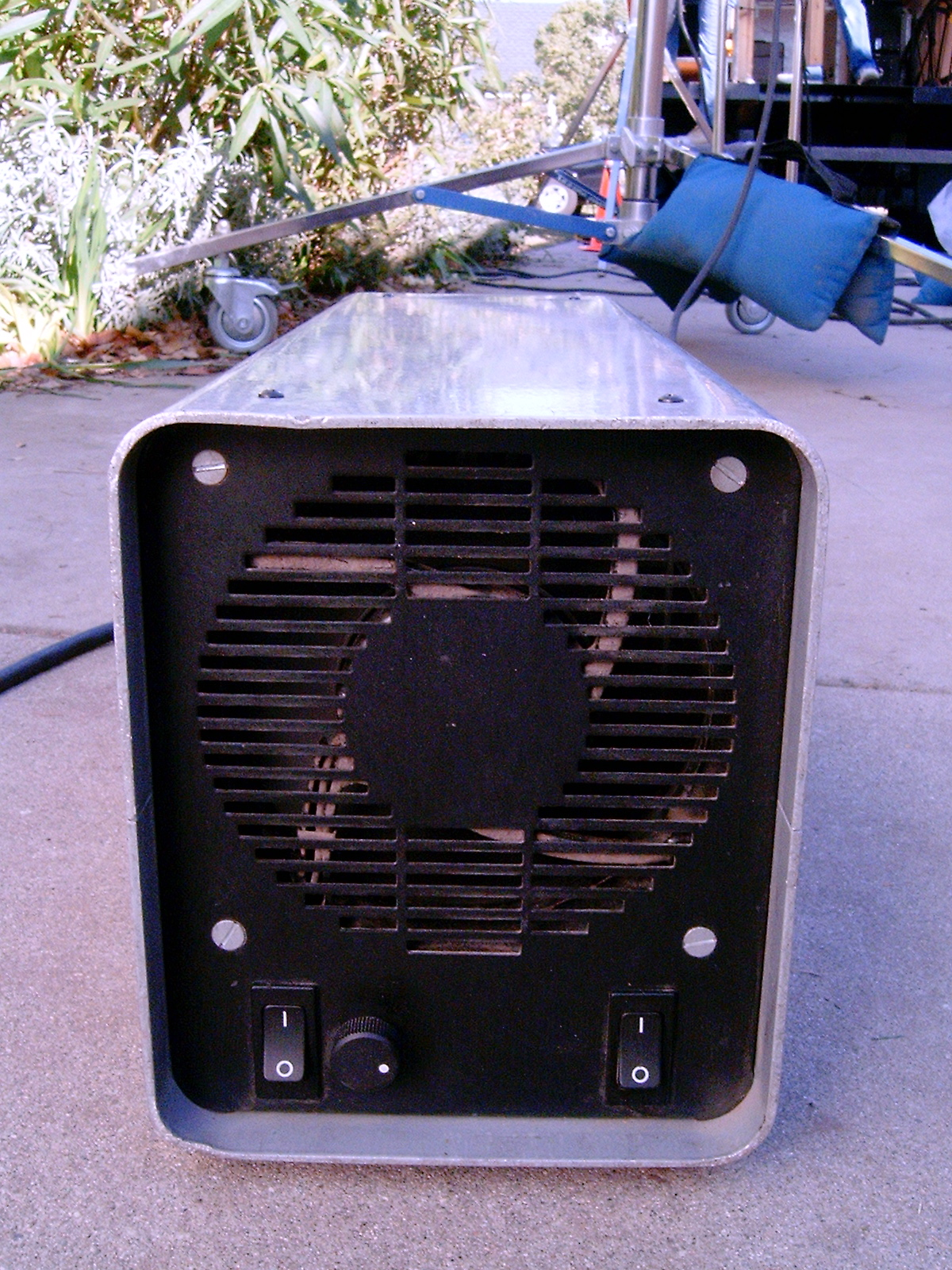
An HMI ballast

To power an HMI bulb, special ballasts act as an ignitor to start the arc, and then regulate it by acting as a choke. Two types of ballasts exist: magnetic and electronic (square-wave or flicker-free). Magnetic ballasts are generally much heavier and bulkier than electronic ballasts, as they consist primarily of a network of large inductors. They are usually cheaper than electronic ballasts. Since the magnetic type of ballast does not maintain the discharge continuously, the lamp actually extinguishes at zero-crossings of the mains waveform; unless the camera is locked to the mains waveform, the difference in frequency between the lamp and the shutter will produce a beat frequency that is visible in the resulting recording. This is why TV standards typically use the power grid frequency as their basic frame rate. Magnetic ballasts are simple devices compared to electronic ballasts. Essentially, a magnetic ballast is a large, heavy transformer coil that uses a simple principle to generate the high startup voltages needed to create an arc in a cold lamp. Input power is routed to a choke coil connected between the main input and the lamp. The coil may be tapped in several places to provide for various input voltages (120 V or 240 V) and a high start-up voltage. Capacitors are also included to compensate for the inductance of the coil and improve the power factor. Because of the high amount of current through the ballast, a low humming sound is often heard due to magnetostriction of the ballast iron laminations. Some magnetic ballasts have insulation around the coil for silent operation.

Since the early 1990s, electronic flicker-free (or Square-Wave) ballasts have become increasingly popular and affordable as an alternative to magnetic ballasts by eliminating most of the problems associated with HMI flicker. Their operation is not as simple as a magnetic ballast. Electronic ballasts can be thought of as operating in three stages—a DC intermediate converter, a power module, and an AC inverter. Power initially flows through the main breakers into an RF mains filter that prevents the flow of noise back onto the incoming power line. Then, rectifiers and capacitors charge and discharge to invert the negative half of the AC cycle and convert the line to positive DC voltage. This is called the DC intermediate. In the second stage, a buck converter draws from the DC intermediate and regulates current to the final power electronics via an electronic control board. This control board carefully adjusts the high frequency duty cycle of its transistors to maintain optimum color and light output as the lamp ages. Finally, the regulated current is inverted by an LF-converter board that uses four Insulated Gate Bipolar Transistors (IGBTs) to switch the DC at precisely 60 Hz into a square wave AC (unlike the sinusoidal pattern of line AC). Leaders in this field include Power Gems Corp, B&S, & Mytronic.

By using a square-wave output that is not referenced to the line cycle rate, a flicker-free output can be produced. Since the IGBTs switch on and off at a regulated cycle rate, a generator can be slightly off-speed and the lamp will still be flicker-free, which is not the case with a standard magnetic ballast. The square wave nature of the output results in a straight-line power output from the lamp. The time where cathodes are not emitting electrons of high enough energy is very short, meaning that safe (flicker-free) filming can occur at camera framerates up to 10,000 frame/s on most electronic ballasts.

This very sharp switching on and off inherent to the square-waveform causes extremely high frequency vibrations in the lamp. A square wave can be thought of as an infinite sum of odd-numbered harmonics, which will include frequencies at the resonant frequency of the bulb, causing it to vibrate at that frequency like a bell or whistle. The lamp housing does not help this, acting as a resonating chamber that amplifies the noise and presents a problem for sync-sound recording for film and video. To correct this, most electronic ballasts are equipped with a silent mode that eliminates the higher frequencies, but rounds off the voltage transition, causing the same flicker issue with magnetics, though to a lesser extent. This mode provides safe, flicker-free filming at framerates up to 24 frame/s on most electronic ballasts.

In addition to solving the problems of flicker, electronic ballasts also provide other advantages over magnetic ballasts. With a square wave voltage, the cathodes spend much more time emitting electrons and exciting the plasma, creating a gain of 5–10% in lumen output. The square-wave nature of the power flow allows lamp life to be extended by as much as 20%. Most modern ballasts are now also equipped with a dimmer, which uses pulse-width modulation to dim the lamp up to 50%, or as much as one stop of light. Unlike a tungsten-based light, which has a negative color temperature shift with a drop in power, the mercury emission spectra takes over with a drop in power (approximately 200 K bluer at 50% output).

== Safety ==
HMI lamps are approximately the same color temperature as the sun at noon (6000 K), and like other high intensity discharge lamps which contain mercury, generate ultraviolet light. Each HMI fixture has a UV safety glass cover that should be used to protect people who may be in front of the light. Exposure to an unprotected lamp can cause retinal damage and severe skin burns.

HMI lamps can reach ignition voltages of up to 70,000 V when striking hot, and are considered very dangerous if miswired. It is good practice to strike the light from the ballast and not the head, in the event that there is a short circuit in the lamp head. Proper striking procedures should be followed as well, such as calling out a vocal warning whenever a light is turned on to warn persons in the area. Also, the header cable should be properly and securely connected. Nearly all present-day header cables are equipped with 'twist-lock' fittings at either end to ensure a safe and precise connection, both at the ballast and the lamp housing.

In all quartz lamps which have a gas fill, there is a small area that looks like a nipple. It is in fact the location of the exhaust tube where the lamp was filled with its gas mixture. The position of the nipple is very important and if it is facing the wrong way, it may show up as a shadow in the optical path. Whenever possible, the exhaust tip should be oriented straight up, or up to 45 degrees from vertical. This will keep the tip in the hottest location, and prevent the iodides and rare earth metals from collecting in it as the lamp cools. If the tip is oriented down, the rare earth metals will collect in it over time and the color of the lamp will shift as they are no longer included in the plasma arc.

In addition to these concerns, HMI lamps have been known to shatter at the end of their lifetime or if stressed enough. While not as violent as the explosion of a xenon short-arc bulb, they require caution. As a result, HMI lamps should not be used beyond half of their rated life, and care should be taken with larger lamps when striking (turning on the lamp), as a lamp is most likely to explode within the first five minutes of striking. For this reason, each HMI lamp will usually carry with it a detailed log of the number of strikes and number of hours it has been used. Care should be taken transporting the lamp and replacing lamps. The gases in an HMI lamp are under a very small pressure, but it does increase with temperature. As with quartz-halogen bulbs, care should be taken not to touch the glass directly as skin oils left behind on the envelope can heat beyond the working temperature of the envelope and cause bubbling and/or a weak point. For this reason, anytime a lamp is handled it should be cleaned with an isopropyl alcohol wipe. Most lamp housing designs are inherently tougher and thicker than traditional tungsten units so that in the event of a bulb explosion, those nearby are protected from flying debris. There is the possibility of the front lens element on the lamp head cracking from thermal shock (though not completely blowing out or shattering). Proper safety procedures should always be followed when using HMI units, as they can be dangerous if misused.

In 2014, journalist Kerry Sanders reported that he had been blinded for 36 hours as a result of overexposure to ultraviolet light from a malfunctioning HMI lamp. Had the fixture included UV protection as is required by OSHA, the output from the lamp would have had no effect.

== See also ==
- High-intensity discharge lamp (HID)
- Ultra-high-performance lamp
- List of light sources
- Large Image Projection
- Large Format Slide Projector
