= Mercury-vapor lamp =

Light source using an electric arc through mercury vapor

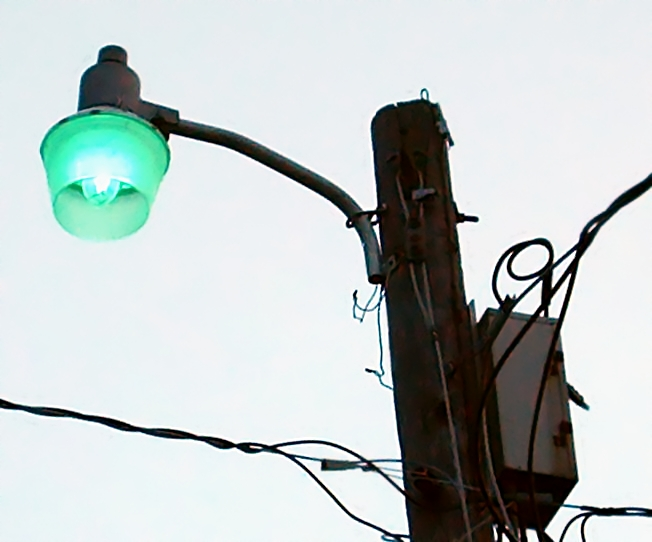
A 175-watt mercury-vapor light approximately 15 seconds after starting.

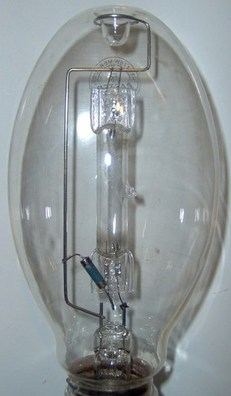
A closeup of a 175 W mercury-vapor lamp. The small diagonal cylinder at the bottom of the arc tube is a resistor which supplies current to the starter electrode.

A mercury-vapor lamp is a gas-discharge lamp that uses an electric arc through vaporized mercury to produce light. The arc discharge is generally confined to a small fused quartz arc tube mounted within a larger soda lime or borosilicate glass bulb. The outer bulb may be clear or coated with a phosphor; in either case, the outer bulb provides thermal insulation, protection from the ultraviolet radiation the light produces, and a convenient mounting for the fused quartz arc tube.

Mercury-vapor lamps are more energy efficient than incandescent lamps with luminous efficacies of 35 to 55 lumens/watt. Their other advantages are a long bulb lifetime in the range of 24,000 hours and a high-intensity light output. For these reasons, they are used for large area overhead lighting, such as in factories, warehouses, and sports arenas as well as for streetlights. Clear mercury lamps produce a greenish light due to mercury's combination of spectral lines. This is not flattering to human skin color, so such lamps are typically not used in retail stores. "Color corrected" mercury bulbs overcome this problem with one or more phosphors such as europium-doped yttrium orthovanadate on the inside of the outer bulb. These emit at red wavelengths, offering whiter light and better color rendition.

Mercury-vapor lights operate at an internal pressure of around one atmosphere and require special fixtures, as well as an electrical ballast. They also require a warm-up period of four to seven minutes to reach full light output. Mercury-vapor lamps are becoming obsolete due to the higher efficiency and better color balance of metal halide lamps.

== Origins ==
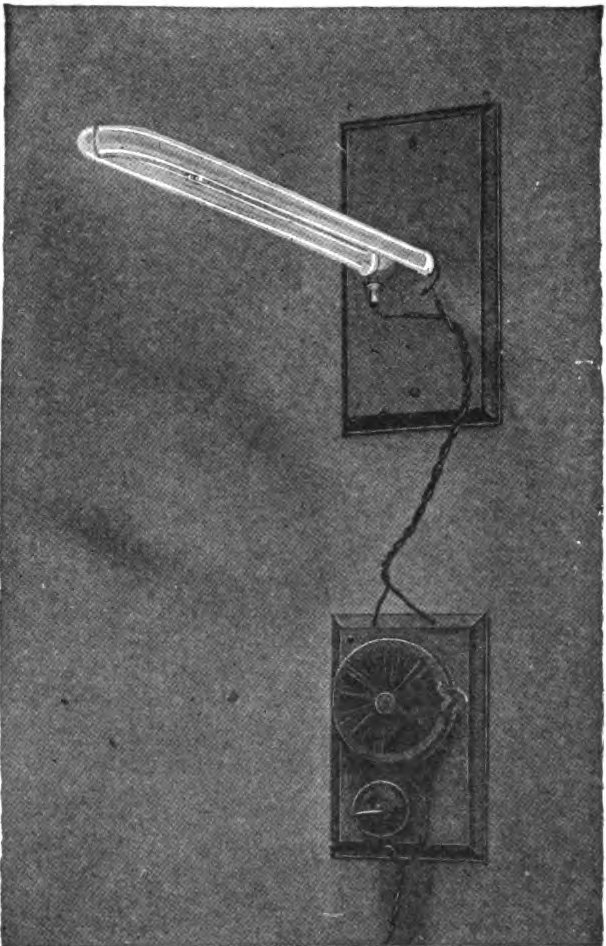
Cooper Hewitt lamp, 1903

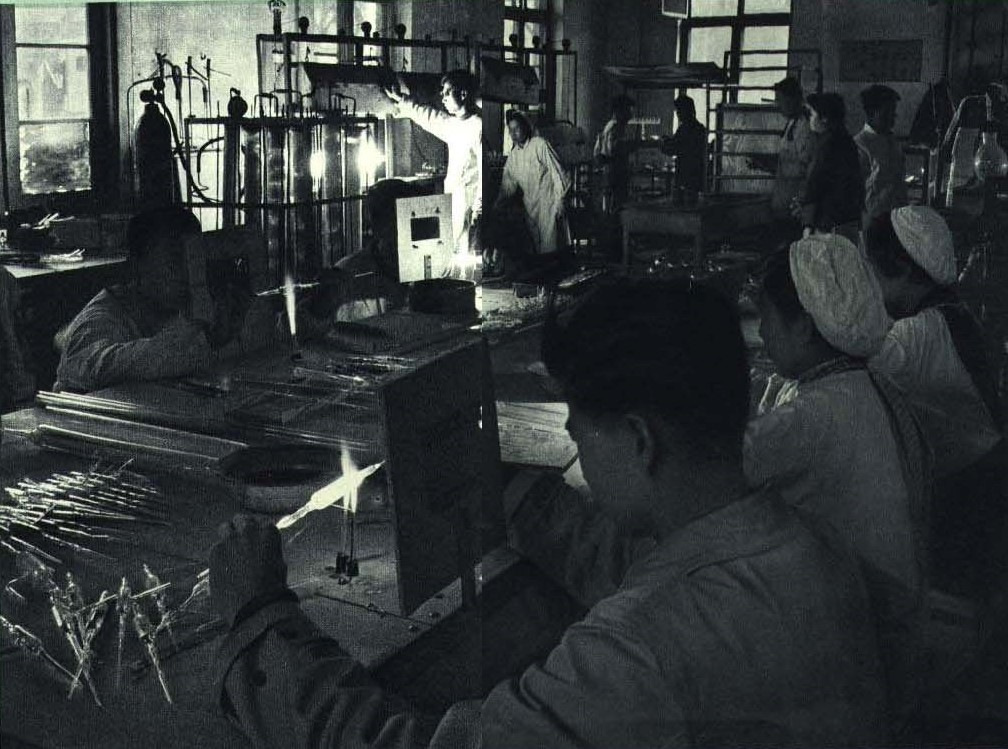
Production of high-pressure mercury-vapor lamps, 1965

Charles Wheatstone observed the spectrum of an electric discharge in mercury vapor in 1835, and noted the ultraviolet lines in that spectrum. In 1860, John Thomas Way used arc lamps operated in a mixture of air and mercury vapor at atmospheric pressure for lighting. The German physicist Leo Arons (1860–1919) studied mercury discharges in 1892 and developed a lamp based on a mercury arc. In February 1896 Herbert John Dowsing and H. S. Keating of England patented a mercury-vapor lamp, considered by some to be the first true mercury-vapor lamp.

The first mercury-vapor lamp to achieve widespread success was invented in 1901 by American engineer Peter Cooper Hewitt. Hewitt was issued U.S. patent 682,692 on September 17, 1901. In 1903, Hewitt created an improved version that possessed more satisfactory color qualities which eventually found widespread industrial use. The ultraviolet light from mercury-vapor lamps was applied to water treatment by 1910. The Hewitt lamps used a large amount of mercury. In the 1930s, improved lamps of the modern form, developed by the Osram-GEC company, General Electric company and others led to widespread use of mercury-vapor lamps for general lighting.

== Principle of operation ==
The mercury in the tube is a liquid at normal temperatures. It needs to be vaporized and ionized before the lamp can produce its full light output. To facilitate starting of the lamp, a third electrode (probe) is mounted near one of the main electrodes and connected through a resistor to the other main electrode. In addition to the mercury, the tube is filled with argon gas at low pressure. When power is applied, if there is sufficient voltage to ionize the argon, the ionized argon gas will strike a small arc between the starting electrode and the adjacent main electrode. As the ionized argon conducts, the heat from its arc vaporizes the liquid mercury; next, the voltage between the two main electrodes will ionize the mercury gas. An arc initiates between the two main electrodes and the lamp will then radiate mainly in the ultraviolet, violet and blue emission lines. Continued vaporization of the liquid mercury increases the arc tube pressure to between 2 and 18 bar, depending on lamp size. The increase in pressure results in further brightening of the lamp. The entire warm-up process takes roughly 4 to 7 minutes, at the end of which the lamp emits primarily in the characteristic green wavelength with mild emissions in the blue spectrum.

The mercury-vapor lamp is a negative resistance device. This means its resistance decreases as the current through the tube increases. So if the lamp is connected directly to a constant-voltage source like the power lines, the current through it will increase until it destroys itself. Therefore, it requires a ballast to limit the current through it. Mercury-vapor lamp ballasts are similar to the ballasts used with fluorescent lamps. In fact, the first British fluorescent lamps were designed to operate from 80-watt mercury-vapor ballasts. There are also self-ballasted mercury-vapor lamps available. These lamps use a tungsten filament in series with the arc tube both to act as a resistive ballast and add continuous black-body radiation to that of the arc tube. Self-ballasted mercury-vapor lamps can be screwed into a standard incandescent light socket supplied with the proper voltage.

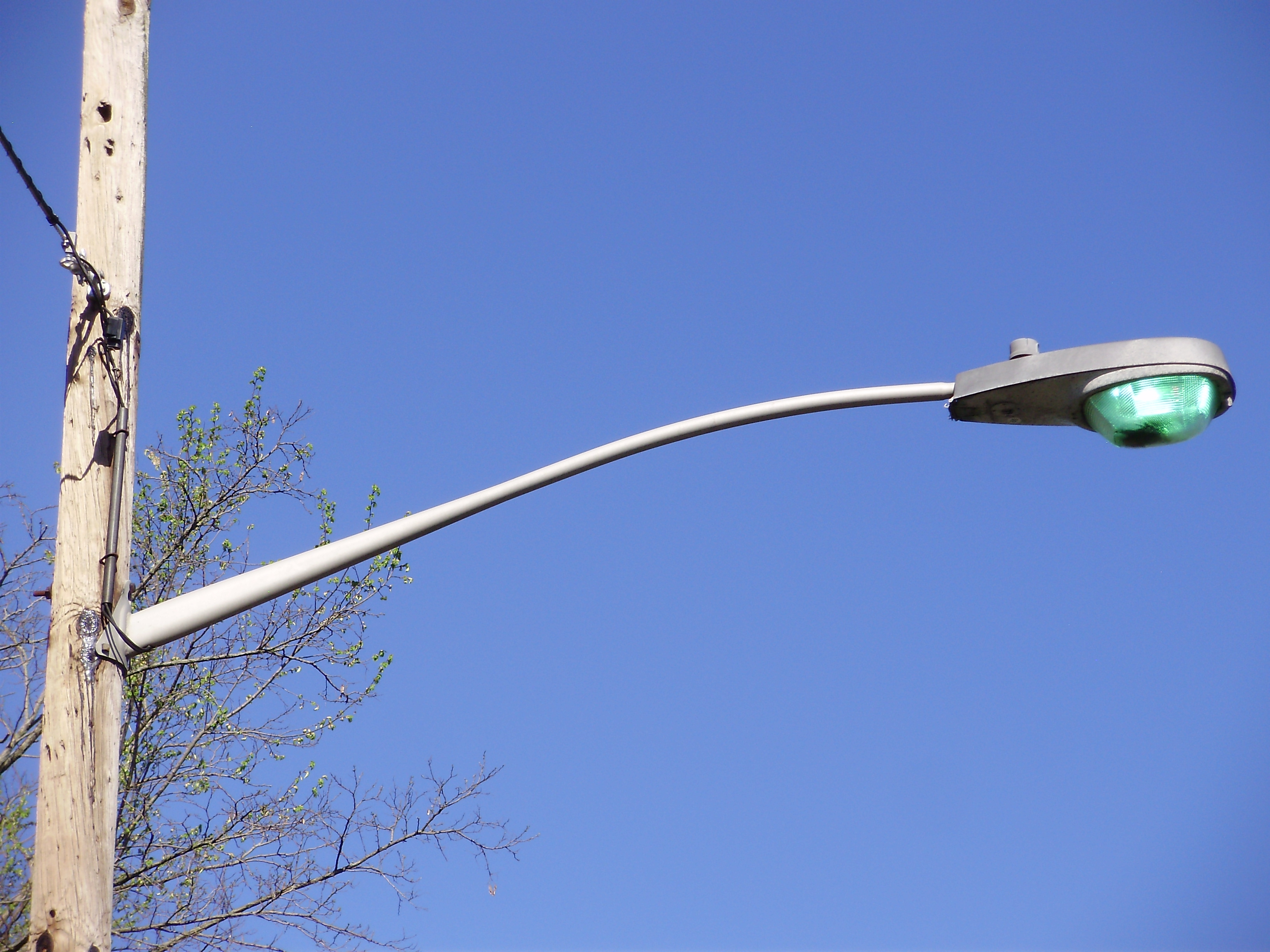
Mercury-vapor street light

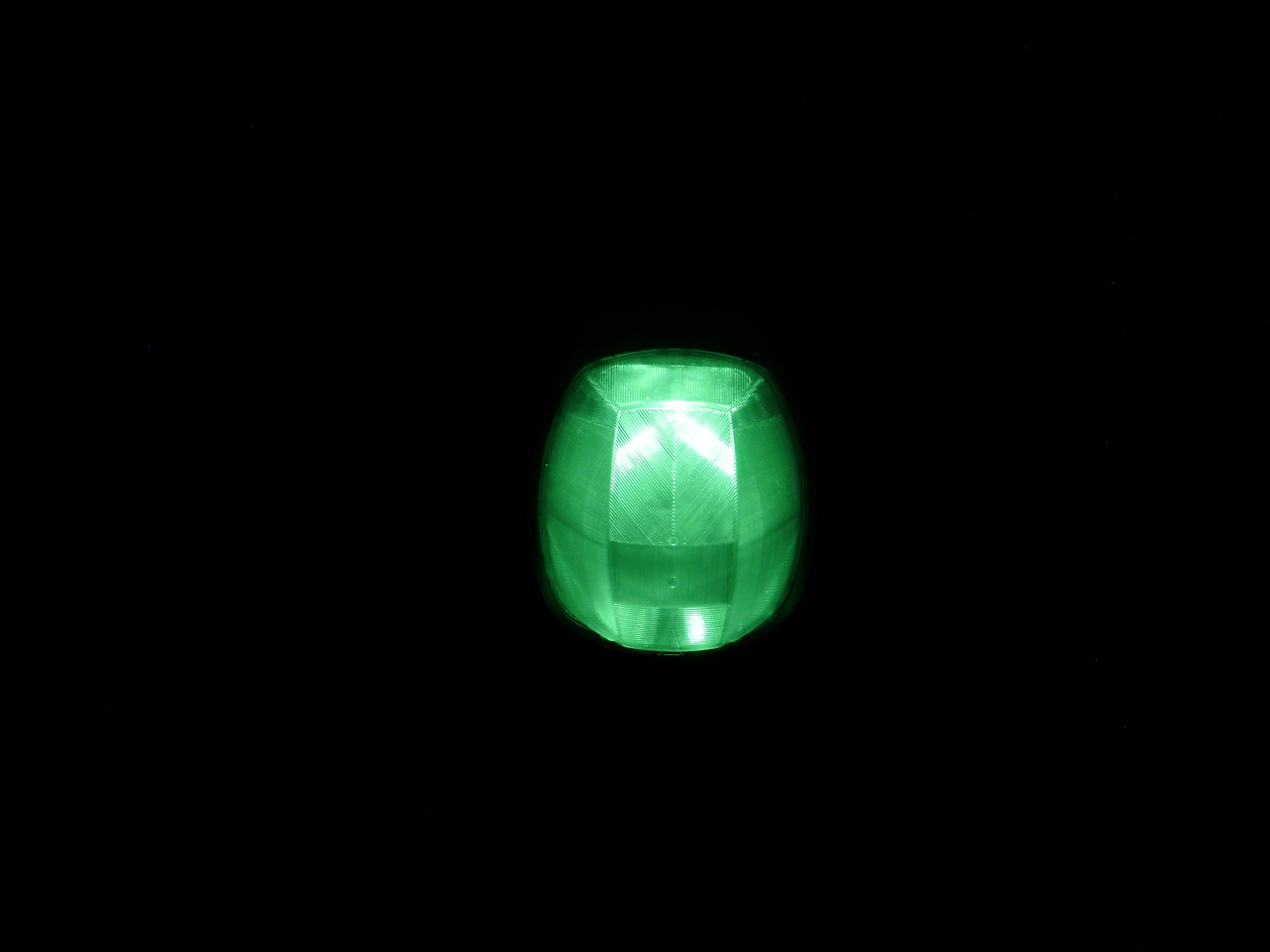
Closeup after dark

=== Metal halide ===
A very closely related lamp design called the metal halide lamp uses various compounds in the form of metal halides with the mercury. Sodium iodide and scandium iodide are commonly used to produce a 4200 K neutral white color. These lamps can produce much better quality light without resorting to phosphors. If they use a starting electrode, there is always a thermal shorting switch to eliminate any electrical potential between the main electrode and the starting electrode once the lamp is lit. (This electrical potential in the presence of the halides can cause the failure of the glass/metal seal). More modern metal halide systems do not use a separate starting electrode; instead, the lamp is started using high voltage pulses in a mechanism known as pulse start, similar to high-pressure sodium vapor lamps.

=== Self-ballasted lamps ===
Self-ballasted (SB) lamps are mercury-vapor lamps with a tungsten filament inside connected in series with the arc tube that functions as an electrical ballast. This is the only kind of mercury-vapor lamp that can be connected directly to the mains without an external ballast. These lamps are about as efficient as incandescent and halogen lamps, but have the added benefit of longer lifespans. They give light immediately on startup, but similar to regular mercury lamps, need a few minutes to restrike if power has been interrupted. Because of the light emitted by the filament, they have significantly better color rendering properties than mercury-vapor lamps. Self-ballasted lamps are typically more expensive than a standard mercury-vapor lamp due to their more complex structure.

== Operation ==
Warm-up of a color corrected 80 W high-pressure mercury-vapor lamp to half brightness

When a mercury-vapor lamp is first turned on, it will produce a dark blue glow because only a small amount of the mercury is ionized and the gas pressure in the arc tube is very low, so much of the light is produced in the ultraviolet mercury bands. As the main arc strikes and the gas heats up and increases in pressure, the light shifts into the visible range and the high gas pressure causes the mercury emission bands to broaden somewhat, producing a light that appears more white to the human eye, although it is still not a continuous spectrum. Even at full intensity, the light from a mercury-vapor lamp with no phosphors is distinctly greenish in color. The pressure in the quartz arc-tube rises to approximately one atmosphere once the bulb has reached its working temperature. If the discharge should be interrupted (e.g. by interruption of the electric supply), it is not possible for the lamp to restrike until the bulb cools enough for the pressure to fall considerably. The reason for a prolonged period of time before the lamp restrikes is to due the elevated pressure, which leads to higher breakdown voltage of the gas inside (voltage needed to start an arc – Paschen's law), which is outside the capabilities of the ballast. Because of this, many mercury-vapor lamps have a secondary lamp to function as a backup light source until the mercury-vapor lamp can restrike. This lamp is usually a halogen lamp of near or equal brightness.

=== Electrical parameters ===
| Power | Voltage | Current |
|---|---|---|
| 50W | 95V | 0.60A |
| 80W | 115V | 0.80A |
| 125W | 125V | 1.15A |
| 250W | 130V | 2.15A |
| 400W | 135V | 3.25A |
| 700W | 140V | 5.40A |
| 1000W | 145V | 7.50A |

=== Color considerations ===
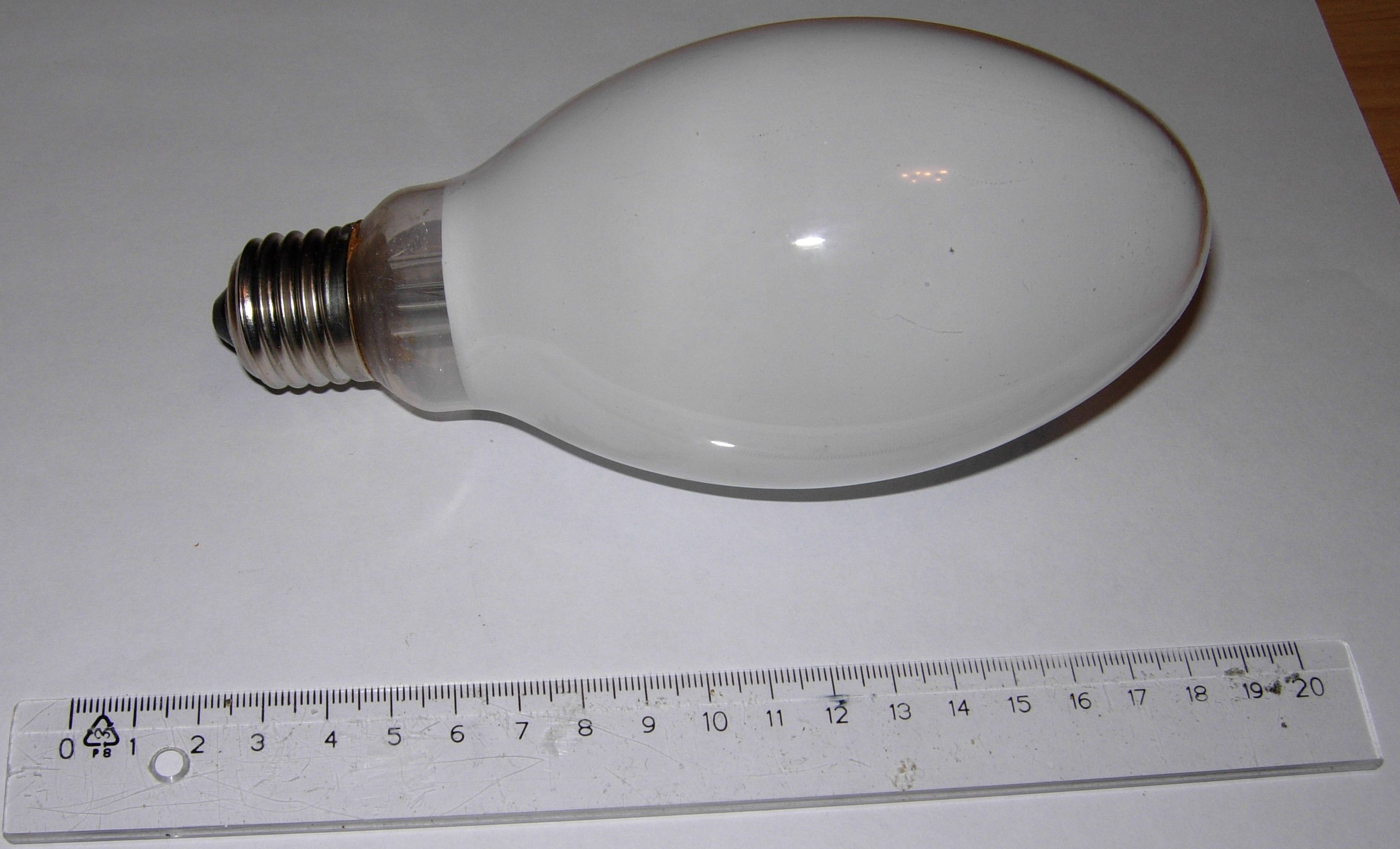
Example of a phosphor-coated 125 W lamp

To correct the greenish tinge, many mercury-vapor lamps are coated on the inside of the outer bulb with a phosphor that converts some portion of the ultraviolet emissions into red light. This helps to fill in the otherwise very-deficient red end of the electromagnetic spectrum. These lamps are generally called "color corrected" lamps. Most modern mercury-vapor lamps have this coating which also improves the color rendition (Ra) from 15–25 to around 50–60. One of the original complaints against mercury-lights was they tended to make people look like "bloodless corpses" because of the lack of light from the red end of the spectrum. A common method of correcting this problem before phosphors were used was to operate the mercury lamp in conjunction with an incandescent lamp. There is also an increase in red color (e.g., due to the continuous radiation) in ultra-high-pressure mercury-vapor (UHP MV) lamps, with internal pressures usually greater than 200 atm., which has found application in older media projectors. When outside, coated or color corrected lamps can usually be identified by a blue "halo" around the light being given off.

=== Emission line spectrum ===
The strongest peaks of the emission line spectrum are

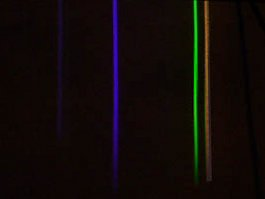
Line spectrum of mercury vapor. The blue-green tint of mercury-vapor lamps is caused by the strong violet and green lines.

| Wavelength (nm) | Name (see photoresist) | Color |
|---|---|---|
| 184.45 | | ultraviolet (UVC) |
| 253.7 | | ultraviolet (UVC) |
| 365.0 | I-line | ultraviolet (UVA) |
| 404.7 | H-line | violet |
| 435.8 | G-line | blue |
| 546.1 | | green |
| 578 | | yellow |

In low-pressure mercury-vapor lamps only the lines at 184 nm and 254 nm are present. Fused silica is used in the manufacturing to keep the 184 nm light from being absorbed. In medium-pressure mercury-vapor lamps, the lines from 200 to 600 nm are present. The lamps can be constructed to emit primarily in the UV-A (around 400 nm) or UV-C (around 250 nm). High-pressure mercury-vapor lamps are commonly used for general lighting purposes. They emit primarily in the blue and green.

== Ultraviolet cleaning ==
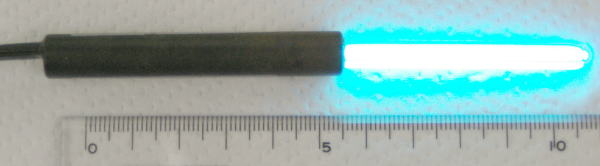
Low-pressure Hg lamps can be rather small, but efficient sources of deep UV light.

Low-pressure mercury-vapor lamps usually have a quartz bulb in order to allow the transmission of short wavelength light. If synthetic quartz is used, then the transparency of the quartz is increased further and an emission line at 185 nm is observed also. Such a lamp can then be used for ultraviolet germicidal irradiation. The 185 nm line will create ozone in an oxygen containing atmosphere, which helps in the cleaning process, but is also a health hazard.

== Light pollution considerations ==
For placements where light pollution is of prime importance (for example, the parking lot of an observatory), low-pressure sodium is preferred. As it emits narrow spectral lines at two very close wavelengths, ie. the sodium D-lines at ~589 nm and ~589.3 nm, it is the easiest to filter out. Mercury-vapor lamps without any phosphor are second best; they produce only a few distinct mercury lines that need to be filtered out.

== Bans ==
In the EU the use of low efficiency mercury-vapor lamps for lighting purposes was banned in 2015. It does not affect the use of mercury in compact fluorescent lamp, nor the use of mercury lamps for purposes other than lighting.

In the US, ballasts for mercury-vapor lamps for general illumination, excluding specialty application mercury-vapor lamp ballasts, were banned after January 1, 2008. Because of this, several manufacturers have begun selling replacement compact fluorescent (CFL) and light emitting diode (LED) bulbs for mercury-vapor fixtures, which do not require modifications to the existing fixture. The US Department of Energy determined in 2015 that regulations proposed in 2010 for the mercury vapor type of HID lamps would not be implemented, because they would not yield substantial savings.

== Ultraviolet hazards ==
The arctube of mercury lamps produces large amount of short wave UV-C radiation which can cause eye and skin burns. Usually the glass outer jacket of the lamp and in some lamps, also the phosphor coating, block this radiation. However, care should be taken if the outer jacket of the lamp breaks, because the arctube would continue to operate, presenting a safety hazard. There have been documented cases in the United States of lamps being damaged in gymnasiums by balls striking the lamps, resulting in sun burns and eye inflammation or photokeratitis from shortwave ultraviolet radiation. When used in locations like gyms, the fixture should contain a strong outer guard or an outer lens to protect the lamp's outer bulb. As a result of the said documented cases, some American manufacturers made "safety" lamps that will deliberately burn out if the outer glass is broken. This is usually achieved by using a thin tungsten strip, which will burn up in the presence of air, to connect one of the electrodes.

Typical mercury-vapor lamps with an outer envelope made of soda lime or borosilicate glass still allow a relatively large amount of 365 nm UV radiation to escape the lamp. This can cause the accelerated aging of some plastics used in the construction of luminaires, leaving them significantly discolored after only a few years' service. Polycarbonate suffers particularly from this problem and it is not uncommon to see fairly new polycarbonate surfaces positioned near the lamp to have turned a dull, yellow color after only a short time.

== Uses ==
=== Area and street lighting ===
Although other types of HIDs are becoming more common, mercury-vapor lamps are still sometimes used for area lighting and street lighting in the much of North America and Japan. However, they are becoming largely obsolete in street lighting, and more broadly outdoor lighting, owing to technologies with greater optical efficiency (LPW) and color rendering, as well as by restrictions imposed by the Minamata Convention on Mercury.

=== UV curing ===
Mercury-vapor lamps are used in the printing industry to cure inks. These are typically high powered to rapidly cure and set the inks used. They are enclosed and have protections to prevent human exposure as well as specialised exhaust systems to remove the ozone generated.

=== Molecular spectroscopy ===
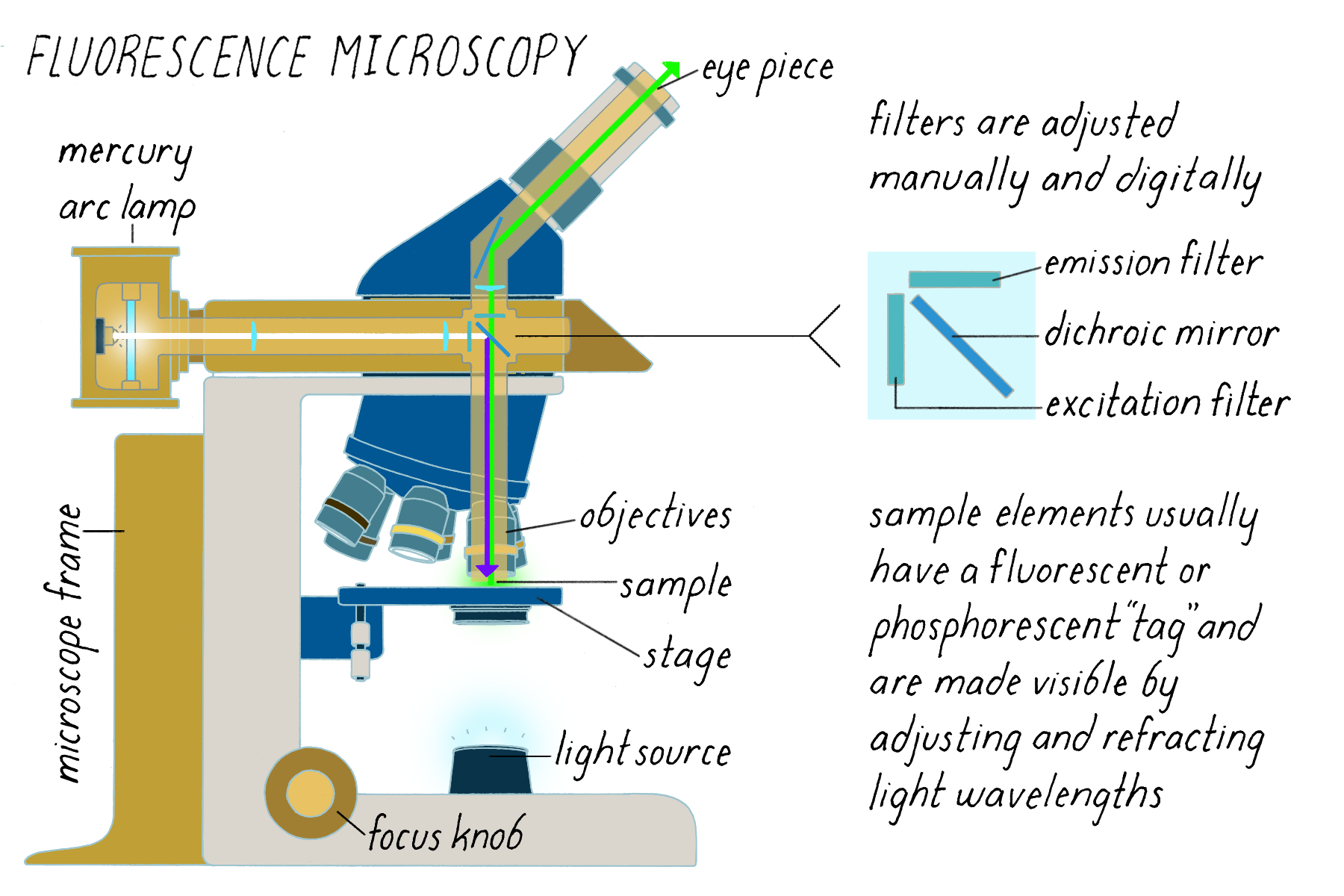
Fluorescence microscopy is a technique that uses a mercury arc lamp and a fluorescent tag to label, and visualize, specific organisms or substances not visible to the naked eye.

High-pressure mercury-vapor (and some specially designed metal-halide) lamps find application in molecular spectroscopy due to providing useful broadband continuum ("noise") energy at millimeter and terahertz wavelengths, owing to the high electron temperature of the arc plasma; the main UV emission line of ionized mercury (254 nm) correlates to a blackbody of T= 11,500 K. This property makes them among the very few simple, inexpensive sources available for generating such frequencies. For example, a standard 250-watt general-lighting mercury lamp produces significant output from 120 GHz to 6 THz. In addition, shorter wavelengths in the mid-infrared are emitted from the hot quartz arc-tube envelope. As with the ultraviolet output, the glass outer bulb is largely opaque at these frequencies and thus for this purpose needs to be removed (or omitted in purpose-made lamps).

=== Projection ===
Special ultra high-pressure mercury-vapor lamps called Ultra-high-performance lamps or UHP lamps, are commonly used in digital video projectors, including DLP, 3LCD and LCoS projectors.

== See also ==
- History of street lighting in the United States
- List of light sources
- Ultra-high-performance lamp
