= Large-format slide projector =

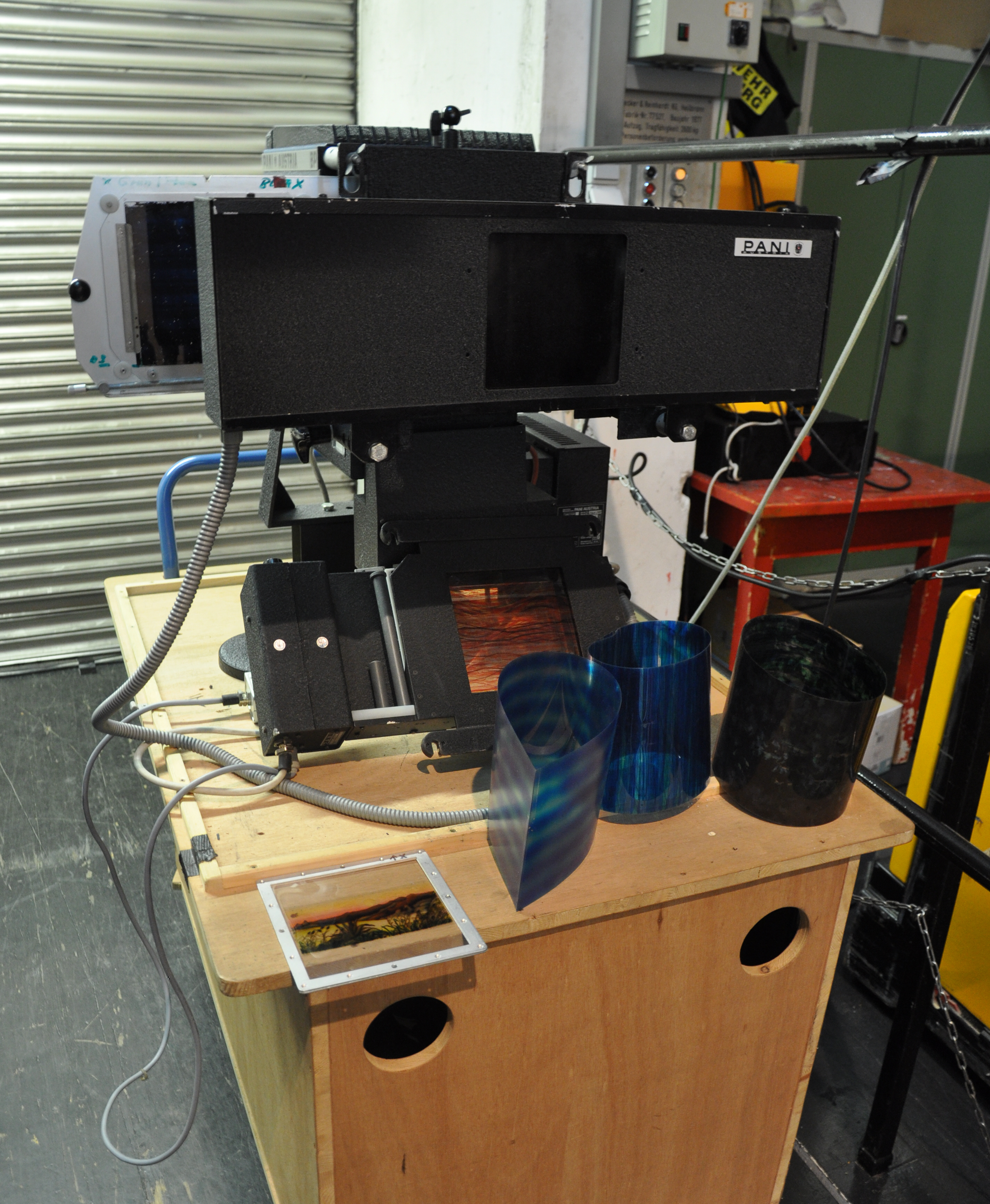
PANI-Projektor, a large-format slide projector in the Ravensburg concert hall

A large-format slide projector (also often called large-format projector or large-image projector) is a kind of slide projector for large image projection which has a very powerful light source (up to 12 thousand watts using arc lamps). The light source generates a lot of heat even when filtered to only visible light; the projected transparency is protected from overheating by the heat being distributed across its large area, and cooling fans. Slide formats include 18 × 18 cm (7.1 × 7.1") or 24 × 24 cm (9.4 × 9.4").

== Projection art ==
These formats are so large that it is possible to project slides painted with heat resistant translucent colours as a special kind of art (projection art). The light output of the projector is large enough to project onto whole buildings.

== History ==
The first large-format slide projectors were built in the middle of the 20th century as background projectors for theaters and opera houses. From the early 50', the german Brand Reiche&Vogel was offering in a catalog a 2000w slide projector using 4.75"x 4.75" (12x12cm) slide or a scroller for film strip of the same size. They will produce a 5000w model no long after this first. The artists Günther Schneider-Siemssen, and Professor Svoboda used the large format slide projectors as stage projectors in their artwork. In good cooperation with the technician Ing. Ludwig Pani, they improved large-format slide projectors for stage, and realized the first large format projections as an integrated part of their artwork.

== Manufacturers ==
Large scale image projectors have been pioneered by manufacturers Reiche&Vogel, Pani, Hardware Xenon and PIGI. These projectors are usually described as scenic projectors, and project light through photographic or inkjet media, unlike video projectors that reflect light off of LCD or DMD (digital micro mirror, sometimes referred to as DLP) devices. Despite advancements in video technology, still image projectors are still capable of many times the luminous output of video projection devices. Scenic projectors sometimes utilize roll based projection media, which allows quick access to hundreds of images and the creation of scrolling imagery, as well as rotating imagery.

The most powerful image projectors in the world are built by the company XL Productions. These one of a kind image projectors utilize large format lenses to achieve image sizes and brightness levels beyond that which is capable with commercially available projectors. XL Productions has presented imagery for events like the Olympics, the Super Bowl and other special productions. In 2000, XL Productions achieved projected image sizes as much as one mile across on Sugarloaf Mountain in Rio de Janeiro, Brazil.

== See also ==
- Hydrargyrum medium-arc iodide lamp
