= Electrical ballast =

Device to limit the current in lamps

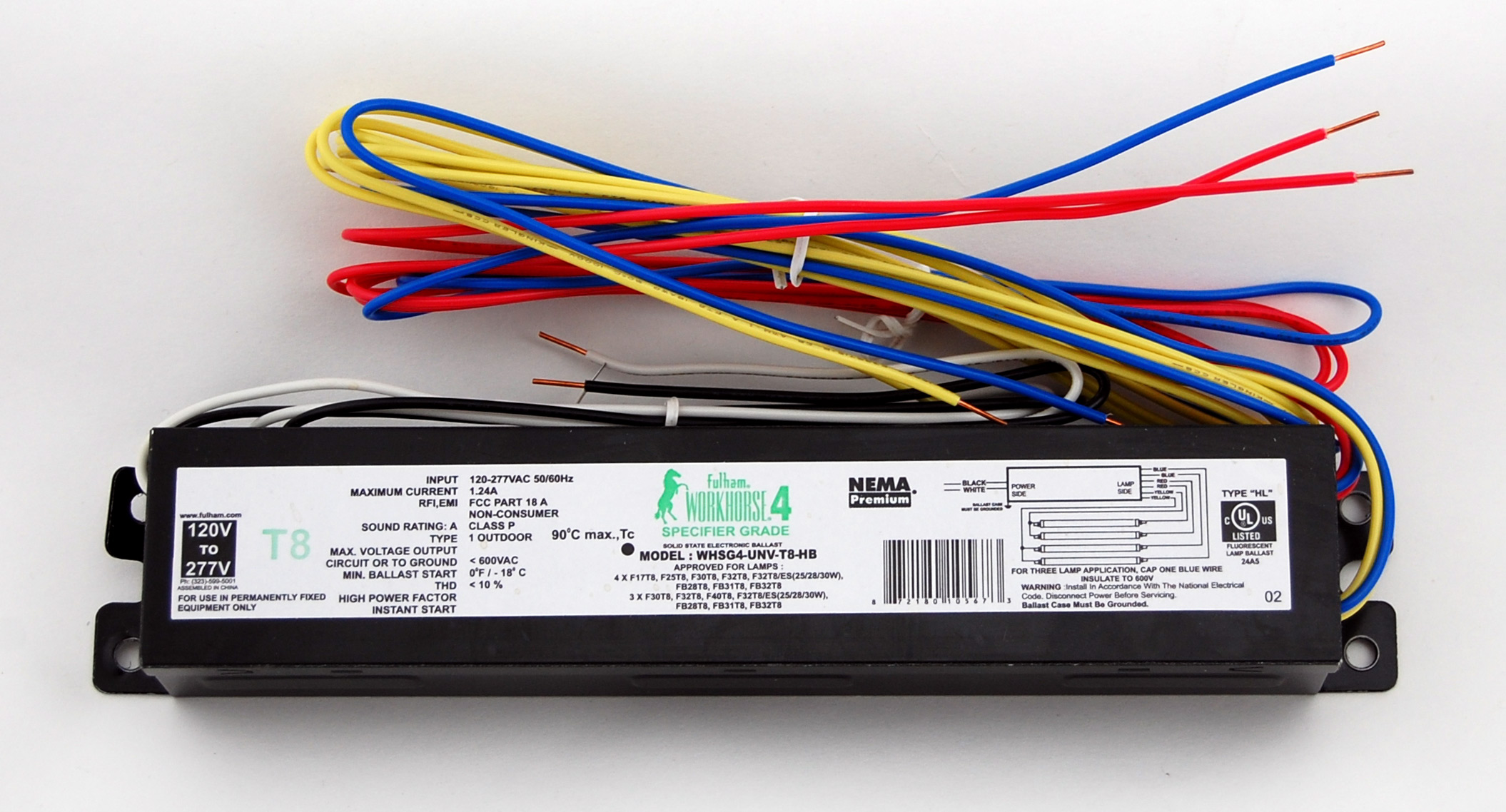
An American electronic instant start ballast for powering a variety of American T8 fluorescent lamps.

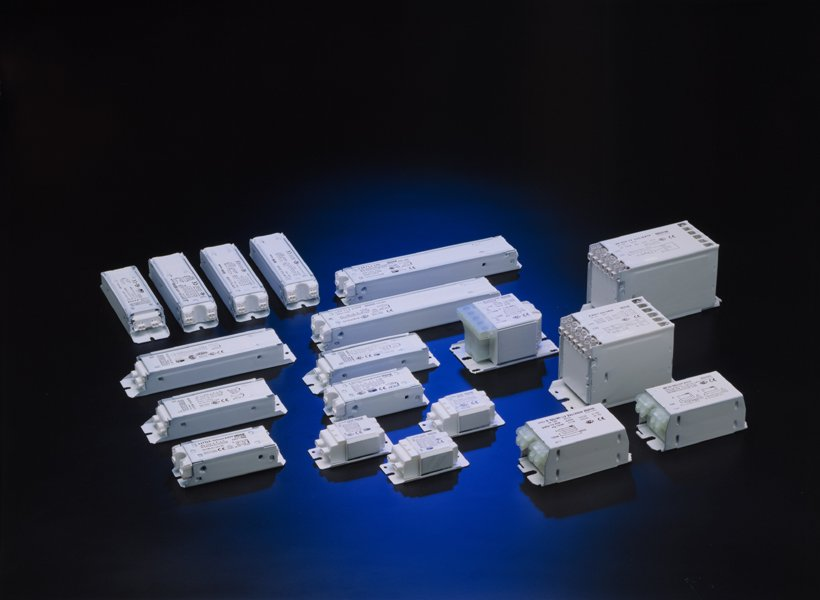
Variety of ballasts for fluorescent and other discharge lamps

An electrical ballast is a device placed in series with a load to limit the amount of current in an electrical circuit.

A familiar and widely used example is the inductive ballast used in fluorescent lamps to limit the current through the tube, which would otherwise rise to a destructive level due to the negative differential resistance of the tube's voltage-current characteristic.

Ballasts vary greatly in complexity. They may be as simple as a resistor, inductor, or capacitor (or a combination of these) wired in series with the lamp; or as complex as the electronic ballasts used in compact fluorescent lamps (CFLs).

== Current limiting ==
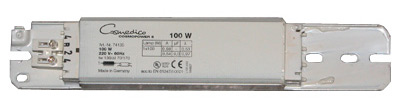
A typical 230V, 50hz series choke ballast (inductor) used in older lighting. This example is used for a tanning lamp. It requires a starter switch (below).

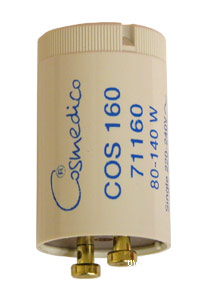
A lamp starter, required with some inductor type ballasts. It connects the two ends of the lamp to preheat them for one second before lighting.

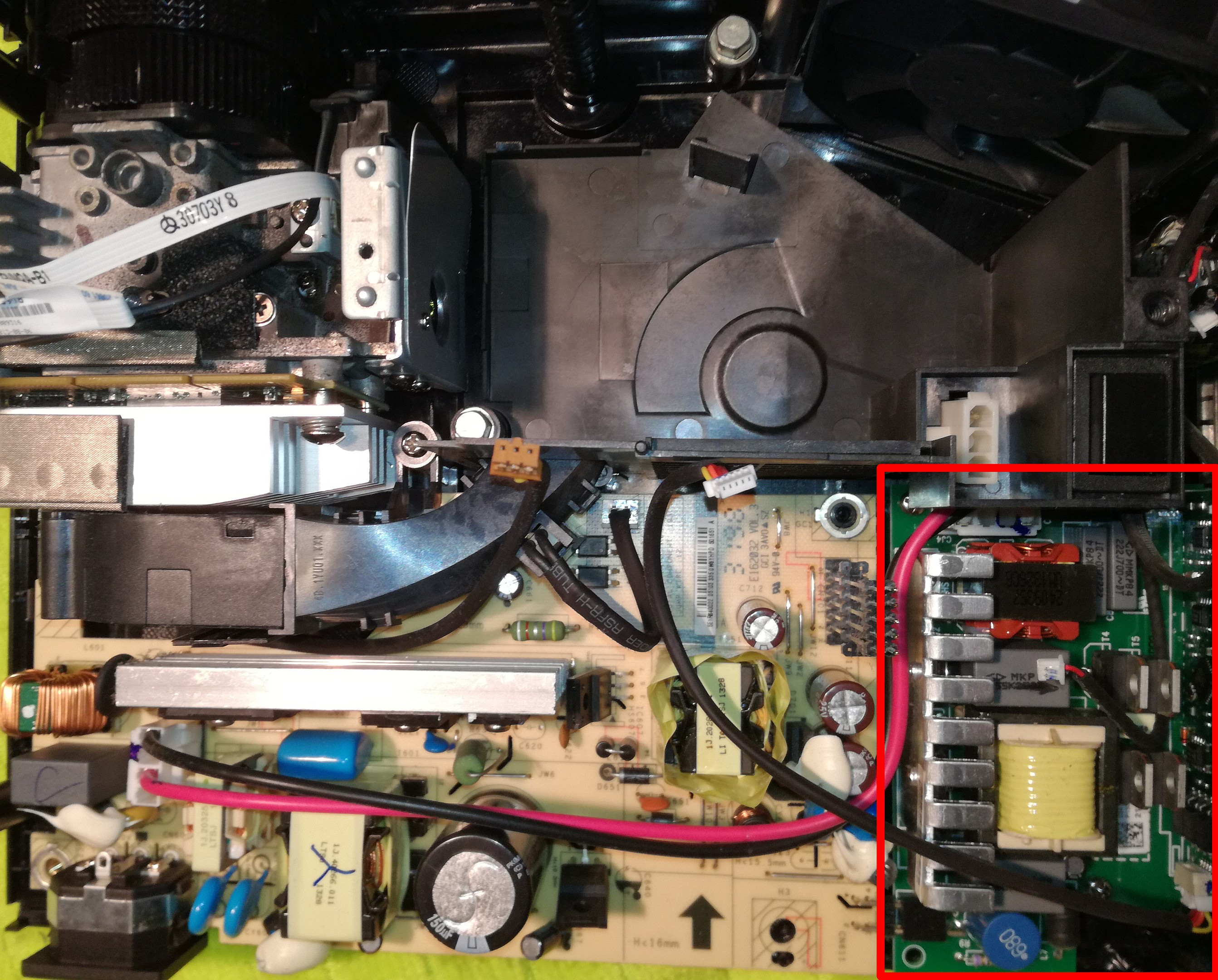
Ballast board for the ultra-high-performance lamp in a DLP projector (bottom right, outlined in red)

An electrical ballast is a device that limits the current through an electrical load. These are most often used when a load (such as an arc discharge) has its terminal voltage decline when current through the load increases. If such a device were connected to a constant-voltage power supply, it would draw an increasing amount of current until it is destroyed or causes the power supply to fail. To prevent this, a ballast provides a positive resistance or reactance that limits the current available to that device.

Ballasts can also be used simply to limit the current in an ordinary, positive-resistance circuit. Prior to the advent of solid-state ignition, automobile ignition systems commonly included a ballast resistor to regulate the voltage applied to the ignition system.

== Resistors ==
=== Fixed resistors ===
For simple, low-powered loads such as a neon lamp, a fixed resistor is commonly used. Because the resistance of the ballast resistor is large, it determines the current in the circuit, even in the presence of negative resistance introduced by the neon lamp.

A ballast resistor was also used in early models of automobile engines to lower the supply voltage to the ignition system after the engine had been started. Starting the engine requires a significant amount of electrical current from the battery, resulting in an equally significant voltage drop. To allow the engine to start, the ignition system was designed to operate on this lower voltage. But once the vehicle was started and the starter disengaged, the battery's normal operating voltage was too high for the ignition system. To avoid this problem, a ballast resistor was inserted in series with the ignition system, resulting in two different operating voltages for the starting and ignition systems.

Occasionally, this ballast resistor would fail and the classic symptom of this failure was that the engine ran while being cranked (while the resistor was bypassed) but stalled immediately when cranking ceased (and the resistor was reconnected in the circuit via the ignition switch). Modern electronic ignition systems (those used since the 1980s or late 1970s) do not require a ballast resistor as they are flexible enough to operate on the lower cranking voltage or the normal operating voltage.

Another common use of a ballast resistor in the automotive industry is adjusting the ventilation fan speed. The ballast is a fixed resistor with usually two center taps, and the fan speed selector switch is used to bypass portions of the ballast: all of them for full speed, and none for the low speed setting. A very common failure occurs when the fan is being constantly run at the next-to-full speed setting (usually 3 out of 4). This will cause a very short piece of resistor coil to be operated with a relatively high current (up to 10 A), eventually burning it out. This will render the fan unable to run at the reduced speed settings.

In some consumer electronic equipment, notably in television sets in the era of valves (vacuum tubes), but also in some low-cost record players, the vacuum tube heaters were connected in series. Since the voltage drop across all the heaters in series was usually less than the full mains voltage, it was necessary to provide a ballast to drop the excess voltage. A resistor was often used for this purpose, as it was cheap and worked with both alternating current (AC) and direct current (DC).

=== Self-variable resistors ===
Some ballast resistors have the property of increasing in resistance as current through them increases, and decreasing in resistance as current decreases. Physically, some such devices are often built quite like incandescent lamps. Like the tungsten filament of an ordinary incandescent lamp, if current increases, the ballast resistor gets hotter, its resistance goes up, and its voltage drop increases. If current decreases, the ballast resistor gets colder, its resistance drops, and the voltage drop decreases. Therefore, the ballast resistor reduces variations in current, despite variations in applied voltage or changes in the rest of an electric circuit. These devices are sometimes called "barretters" and were used in the series heating circuits of 1930s to 1960s AC/DC radio and TV home receivers.

This property can lead to more precise current control than merely choosing an appropriate fixed resistor. The power lost in the resistive ballast is also reduced because a smaller portion of the overall power is dropped in the ballast compared to what might be required with a fixed resistor.

Household clothes dryers sometimes incorporated a germicidal lamp in series with an ordinary incandescent lamp; the incandescent lamp operated as the ballast for the germicidal lamp. A commonly used light in the home in the 1960s in 220–240 V countries was a circular tube ballasted by an under-run regular mains filament lamp. Self-ballasted mercury-vapor lamps incorporate ordinary tungsten filaments within the overall envelope of the lamp to act as the ballast, and to partially compensate for the red-deficient light produced by the mercury vapor process.

== Reactive ballasts ==
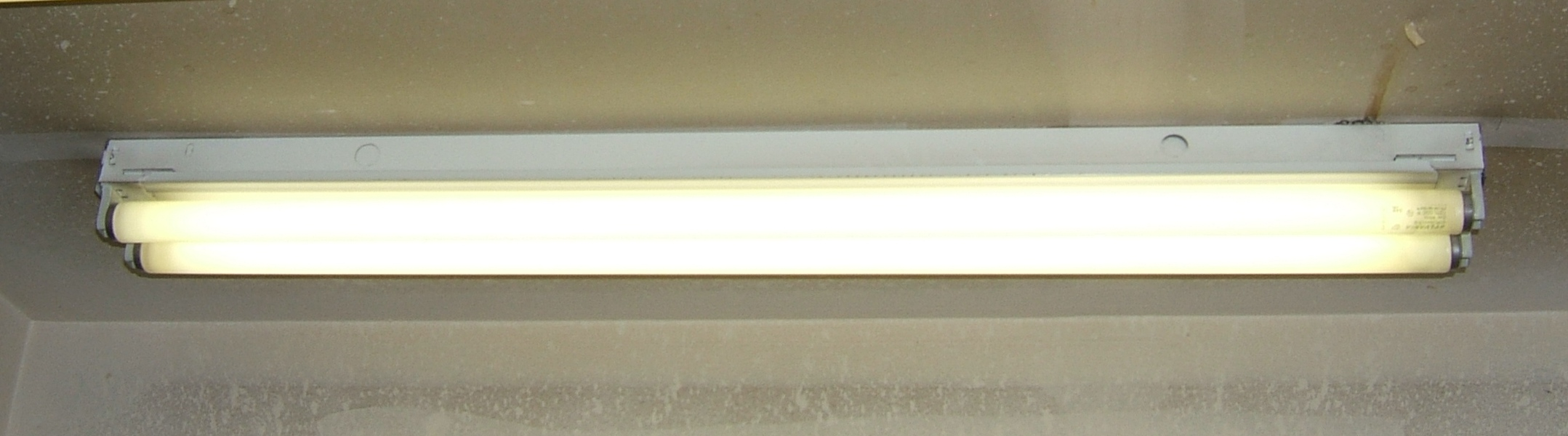
A fluorescent lamp, a device with negative differential resistance. In operation, an increase in current through the fluorescent tube causes a drop in voltage across it. If the tube were connected directly to the power line, the falling tube voltage would cause more and more current to flow until it destroyed itself. To prevent this, fluorescent tubes are connected to the power line through a ballast. The ballast adds positive impedance (AC resistance) to the circuit to counteract the negative resistance of the tube, limiting the current.

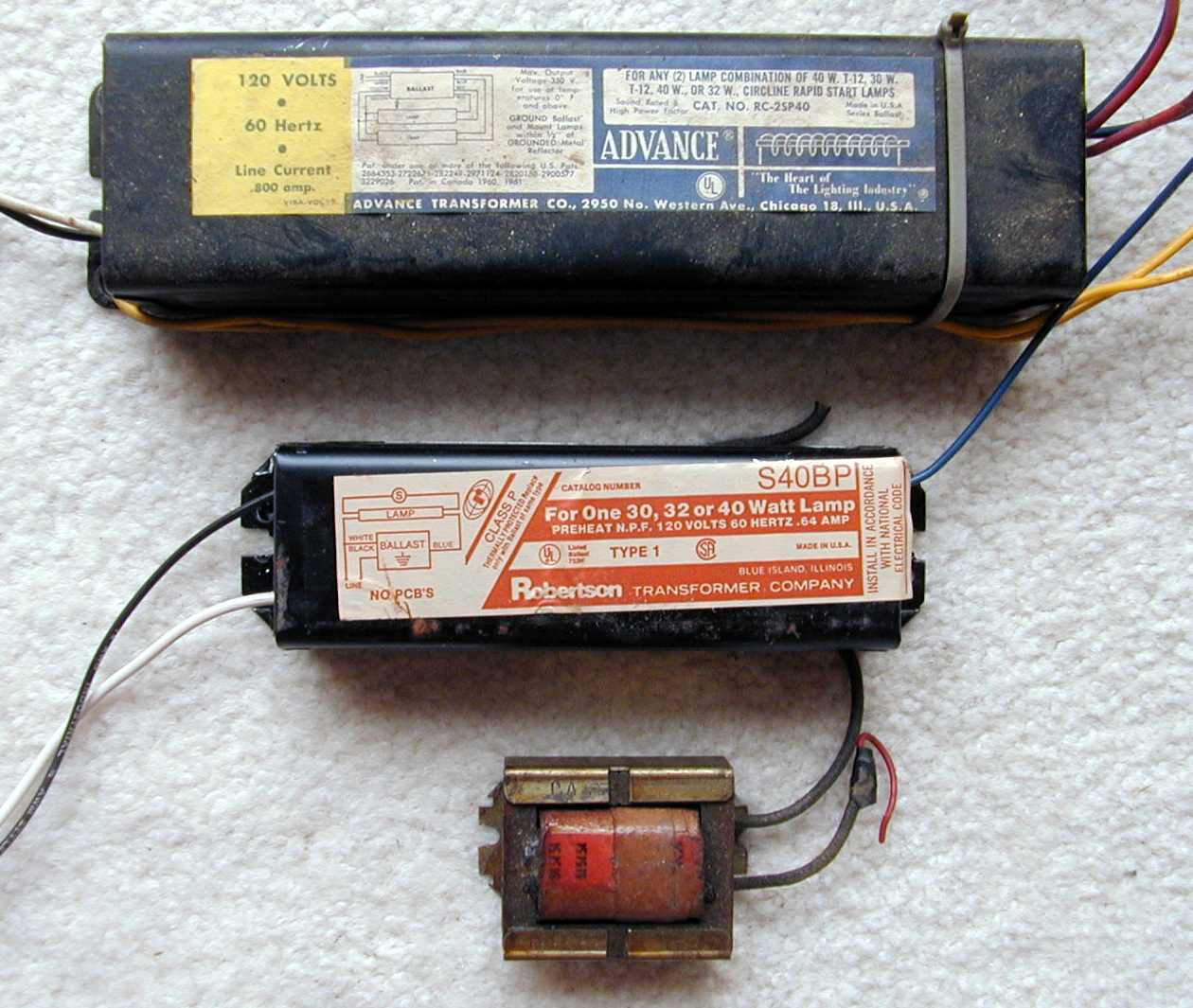
Several American magnetic ballasts for fluorescent lamps. The top is a rapid start series autoregulator ballast for two 30–40 W lamps. The middle is a preheat reactor ballast for a single 30–40 W lamp while the bottom ballast is a simple inductor used with a 15 W preheat lamp.

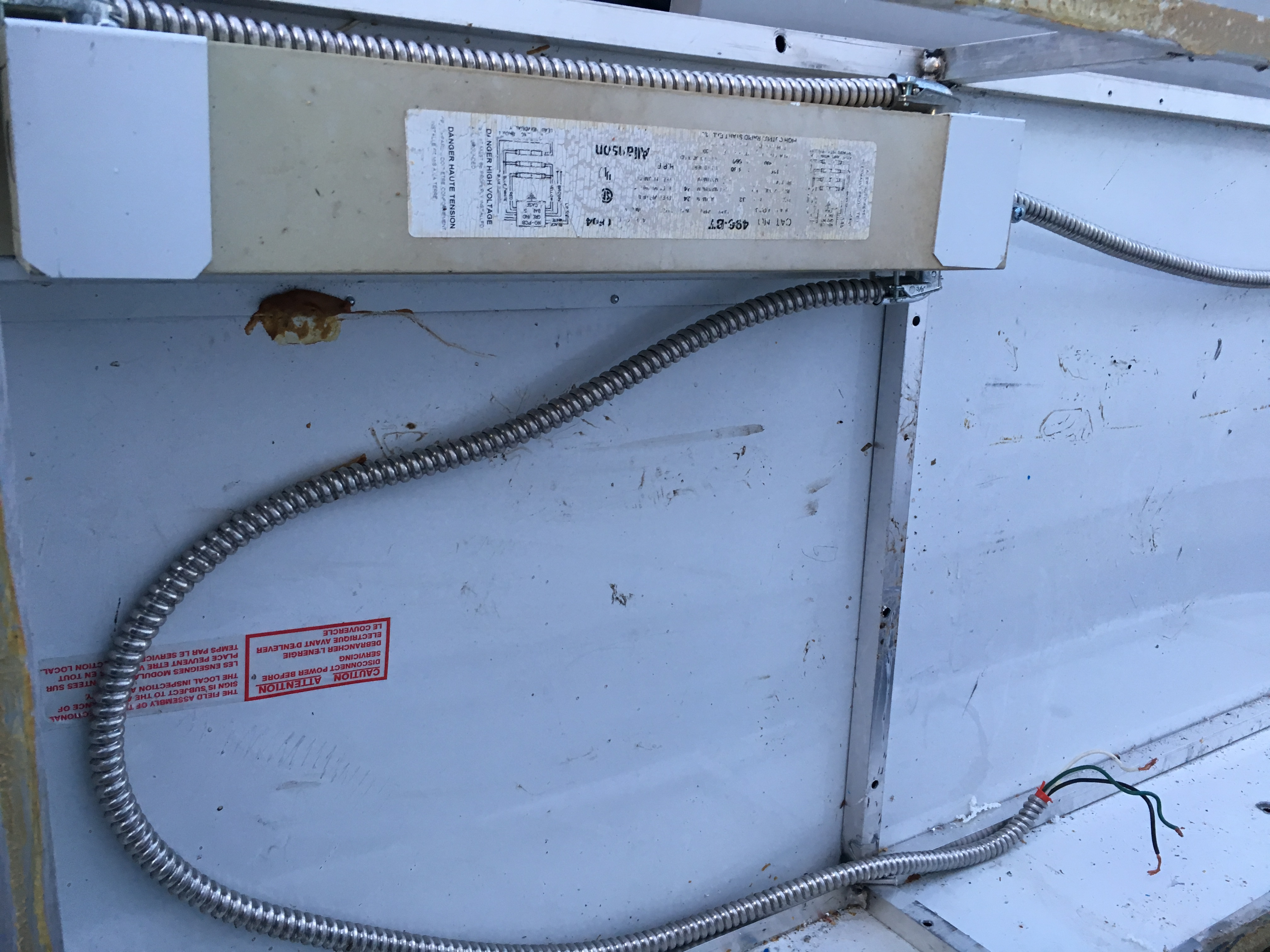
An American magnetic ballast for signs in an aluminum sign frame. Ballasts for sign lighting in the United States are heavier duty than other ballasts because the cooler outdoor temperatures increase the energy required to start a fluorescent tube. They are sized based on the total tube length used.

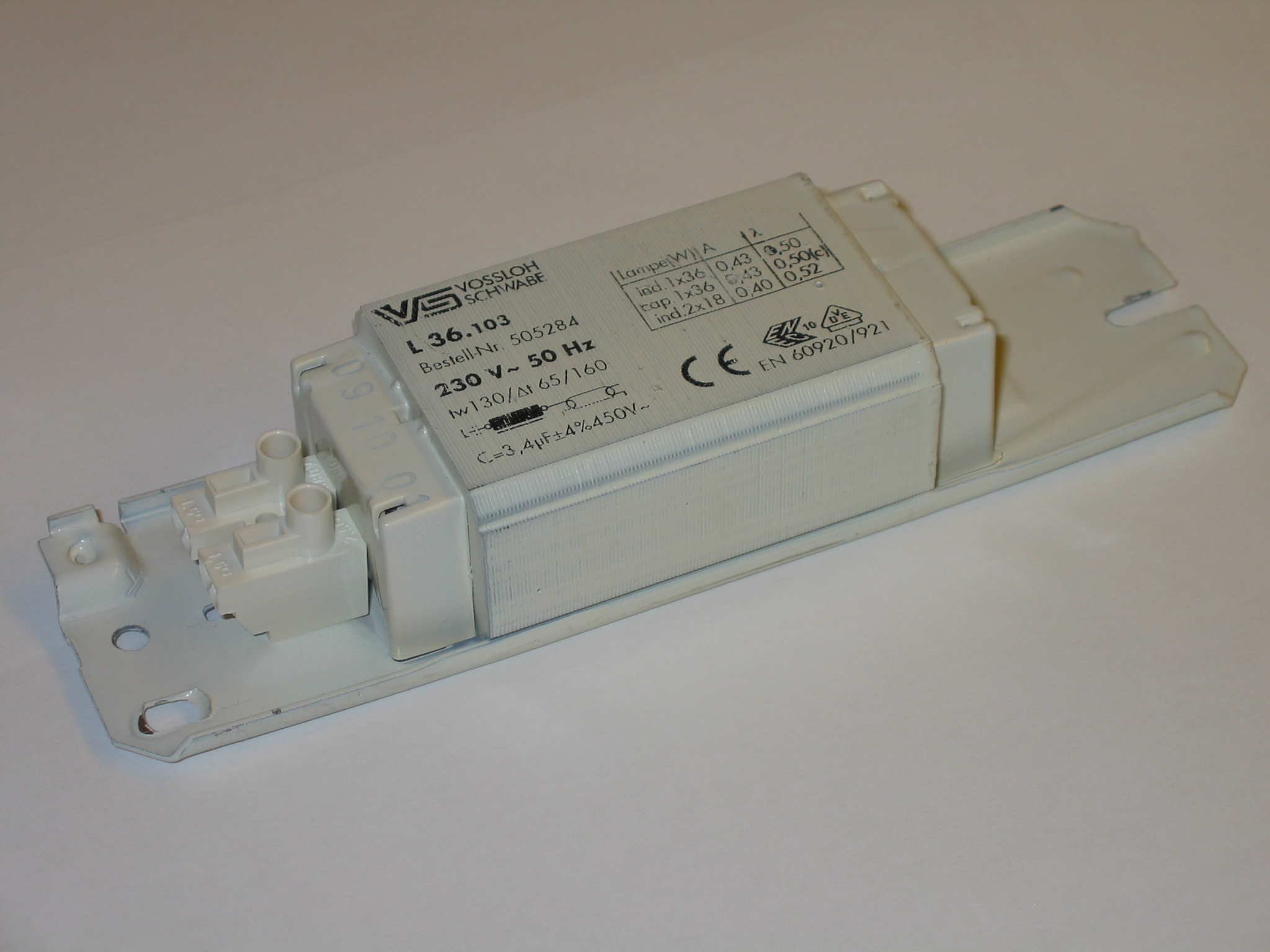
Typical European 230V series choke ballast 40W T12 or 36W T8 fluorescent lamps.

An inductor, usually a choke, is very common in line-frequency ballasts to provide the proper starting and operating electrical condition to power a fluorescent lamp or a high intensity discharge lamp. (Because of the use of the inductor, such ballasts are usually called magnetic ballasts.) The inductor has two benefits:

1. Its reactance limits the power available to the lamp with only minimal power losses in the inductor
2. The voltage spike produced when current through the inductor is rapidly interrupted is used in some circuits to first strike the arc in the lamp.

A disadvantage of the inductor is that current is shifted out of phase with the voltage, producing a poor power factor. In more expensive ballasts, a capacitor is often paired with the inductor to correct the power factor. In autotransformer ballasts that control two or more lamps, line-frequency ballasts commonly use different phase relationships between the multiple lamps. This not only mitigates the flicker of the individual lamps, it also helps maintain a high power factor. These ballasts are often called lead-lag ballasts because the current in one lamp leads the mains phase and the current in the other lamp lags the mains phase.

In most 220-240V ballasts, the capacitor isn't incorporated inside the ballast like in North American ballasts, but is wired in parallel or in series with the ballast.

In Europe, and most 220-240 V territories, the line voltage is sufficient to start lamps over 30W with a series inductor. In North America and Japan, however, the line voltage (120 V or 100 V respectively) may not be sufficient to start lamps over 30 W with a series inductor, so an autotransformer winding is included in the ballast to step up the voltage. The autotransformer is designed with enough leakage inductance (short-circuit inductance) so that the current is appropriately limited.

Because of the large inductors and capacitors that must be used, as well as the heavy iron core of the inductor, reactive ballasts operated at line frequency tend to be large and heavy. They commonly also produce acoustic noise (line-frequency hum).

Prior to 1980 in the United States, polychlorinated biphenyl (PCB)-based oils were used as an insulating oil in many ballasts to provide cooling and electrical isolation (see Transformer oil).

== Electronic ballasts ==
An electronic ballast uses solid state electronic circuitry to provide the proper starting and operating electrical conditions to power discharge lamps. An electronic ballast can be smaller and lighter than a comparably rated magnetic one. An electronic ballast is usually quieter than a magnetic one, which produces a line-frequency hum by vibration of the core laminations.

Electronic ballasts are often based on switched-mode power supply (SMPS) topology, first rectifying the input power and then chopping it at a high frequency. Advanced electronic ballasts may allow dimming via pulse-width modulation or via changing the frequency to a higher value. Ballasts incorporating a microcontroller (digital ballasts) may offer remote control and monitoring via networks such as LonWorks, Digital Addressable Lighting Interface (DALI), DMX512, Digital Serial Interface (DSI) or simple analog control using a 0-10 V DC brightness control signal. Systems with remote control of light level via a wireless mesh network have been introduced.

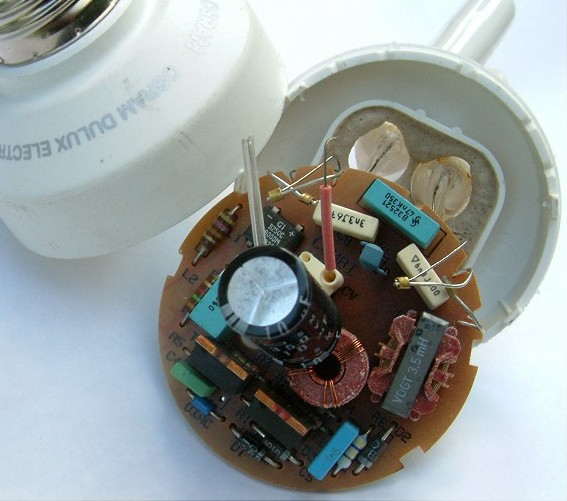
Electronic ballast of a compact fluorescent lamp

Electronic ballasts usually supply power to the lamp at a frequency of 20 kHz or higher, rather than the mains frequency of 50 – 60 Hz; this substantially eliminates the stroboscopic effect of flicker, a product of the line frequency associated with fluorescent lighting (see photosensitive epilepsy). The high output frequency of an electronic ballast refreshes the phosphors in a fluorescent lamp so rapidly that there is no perceptible flicker. The flicker index, used for measuring perceptible light modulation, has a range from 0.00 to 1.00, with 0 indicating the lowest possibility of flickering and 1 indicating the highest. Lamps operated on magnetic ballasts have a flicker index between 0.04 and 0.07, while digital ballasts have a flicker index of below 0.01.

Because more gas remains ionized in the arc stream, the lamp operates at about 9% higher efficacy above approximately 10 kHz. Lamp efficiency increases sharply at about 10 kHz and continues to improve until approximately 20 kHz. Electronic ballast retrofits to existing street lights had been tested in some Canadian provinces circa 2012; since then LED retrofits have become more common.

Low-pressure lamps, including fluorescent ones, are more efficient when driven by electronic ballasts. High-pressure lamps, like metal halide and high pressure sodium lamps, do not benefit from the use of electronic ballasts, as the higher switching frequency reduces these lamps' reliability due to acoustic resonance. These lamps are instead efficient when driven with low frequency square wave current, in the range of 100 – 400 Hz.

Many modern electronic ballasts can operate both high pressure sodium (HPS) lamps as well as metal-halide lamps. The ballast initially works as a starter for the arc by its internal ignitor, supplying a high-voltage impulse and, later, it works as a limiter/regulator of the electric flow inside the circuit. Electronic ballasts also run much cooler and are lighter than their magnetic counterparts.

== Fluorescent lamp ballast topologies ==
=== Preheating ===
This technique uses a combination filament–cathode at each end of the lamp in conjunction with a mechanical or automatic (bimetallic or electronic) switch that initially connects the filaments in series with the ballast to preheat them. When filaments are disconnected, an inductive pulse from the ballast starts the lamp. This system is described as "Preheat" in North America and "Switch Start" in the UK, and has no specific description in the rest of the world. This system is common in 200–240 V countries (and for 100–120 V lamps up to about 30 watts).

Although an inductive pulse makes it more likely that the lamp will start when the starter switch opens, it is not actually necessary. The ballast in such systems can equally be a resistor. A number of fluorescent lamp fittings used a filament lamp as the ballast in the late 1950s through to the 1960s. Special lamps were manufactured that were rated at 170 volts and 120 watts. The lamp had a thermal starter built into the 4-pin base. The power requirements were much larger than using an inductive ballast (though the consumed current was the same), but the warmer light from the lamp-type ballast was often preferred by users, particularly in a domestic environment.

Resistive ballasts were used with direct current (DC) supplies. These fittings used the thermal type of starter, and may also have included a choke in the circuit to provide a pulse on opening of the starter switch for improved starting. DC fittings were complicated by the need to reverse the polarity of the supply to the tube each time it started. Failure to do so vastly shortened the life of the tube.

=== Instant start ===
An instant start ballast does not preheat the electrodes; instead, it uses a relatively high voltage (~600 V) to initiate the discharge arc. It is the most energy-efficient type, but yields the fewest lamp-start cycles, as material is blasted from the surface of the cold electrodes each time the lamp is turned on. Instant-start ballasts are best suited to applications with long duty cycles, where the lamps are not frequently turned on and off. Although these were mostly used in countries with 100-120 volt mains supplies (for lamps of 40 W or above), they were briefly popular in other countries because the lamp started without the flicker of switch-start systems. The popularity was short lived because of the short lamp life.

=== Rapid start ===
A rapid start ballast heats the lamp electrodes continually during operation, using a heating supply winding on the transformer ballast. Rapid start provides longer lamp life and more cycle life than instant start, but has very high ballast losses due to the heating power supplied to the electrodes. Although popular in the United States and Canada for lamps of 40 W and above, rapid start is sometimes used in other countries, particularly where the flicker of switch start systems is undesirable.

=== Dimmable ballast ===
A dimmable ballast is very similar to a rapid start ballast, except that the ballasting coil is connected to a dimmer. A quadrac type light dimmer can be used with a dimming ballast, which maintains the heating current while allowing lamp current to be controlled. A resistor of about 10 kΩ is required to be connected in parallel with the fluorescent tube to allow reliable firing of the quadrac at low light levels.

There are dimmable electronic ballasts that use 1-10V or DALI interfaces to dim the lamp.

=== Emergency ===
An electronic ballast with an integrated rechargeable battery is designed to provide emergency egress lighting in the event of a power failure. It can be incorporated into an existing fluorescent light fixture or mounted remotely outside of it. When power is lost, the ballast will illuminate one or more lamps in the fixture at a reduced output for a minimum of 90 minutes (as required by code). These can be used as an alternative to egress lighting powered by a back-up electrical generator.

=== Hybrid ===
A hybrid ballast is a magnetic ballast with an integrated electronic starter. Like a magnetic ballast, a hybrid unit operates at line power frequency—50 Hz in Europe, for example. These types of ballasts, which are also referred to as cathode-disconnect ballasts, disconnect the electrode-heating circuit after they start the lamps.

== ANSI ballast factor ==
For a lighting ballast, the ANSI ballast factor is used in North America to compare the light output (in lumens) of a lamp operated on a ballast compared to the lamp operating on an ANSI reference ballast. Reference ballast operates the lamp at its ANSI-specified nominal power rating. The ballast factor of practical ballasts must be considered in lighting design; a low ballast factor may save energy, but will produce less light and shorten the lamp life. With fluorescent lamps, ballast factor can vary from the reference value of 1.0.

== Ballast triode ==
Early tube-based color TV sets used a ballast triode, such as the PD500, as a parallel shunt stabilizer for the cathode-ray tube (CRT) acceleration voltage, to keep the CRT's deflection factor constant.

== See also ==
- Iron-hydrogen resistor
- Sodium lamp
