= Leo Arons =

German physicist and politician (1860–1919)

Martin Leo Arons
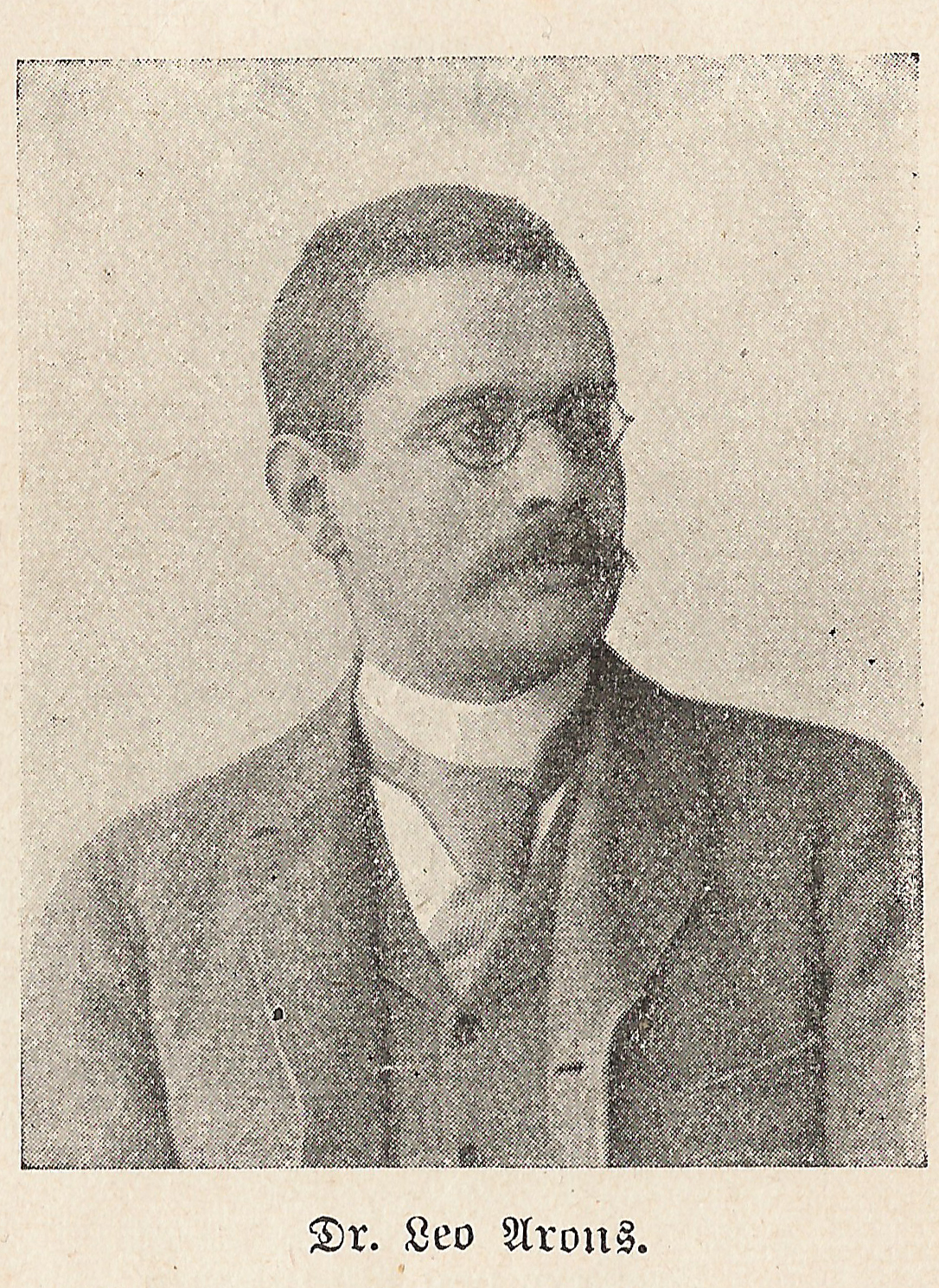
- Born: 15 February 1860; Berlin, Prussia
- Died: 10 October 1919 (aged 59); Berlin, Germany
- Education: University of Strasbourg
- Known for: Invention of mercury vapor lamp; Lex Arons
- Spouse: Johanna Bleichröder (1861-1938)
- Scientific career
- Fields: Experimental physics
- Workplaces: Friedrich-Wilhelms-Universität Berlin (now Humboldt University of Berlin)

Martin Leo Arons (15 February 1860 – 10 October 1919) was a German physicist and social democratic politician. He was the namesake of the Lex Arons, a law which disallowed members of the Social Democratic Party of Germany (German: Sozialdemokratische Partei Deutschlands, SPD) to teach at Prussian universities.

== Life and work ==
Leo Arons came from a wealthy Jewish banking family in Berlin. His parents were Albert Arons (1826–1897), a partner in the prestigious private banking house Gebrüder Arons, and Clara Goldschmidt (1837–1867). In 1887 Leo Arons married Johanna Bleichröder (1861–1938), a daughter of the banker Julius Bleichröder (1828–1907). Arons' brother, the banker Paul Arons (1861–1932), married Johanna's sister Gertrude (1865–1917) a few years later.

After taking his Abitur, Leo Arons studied chemistry and physics, earning a doctorate degree in Strasbourg in 1888. As a scientist he worked in the area of experimental physics. He developed the mercury vapor lamp (also called "Arons' tube"), which was later marketed by AEG as "Dr. Arons' mercury vapor lamp". In 1890 he became a Privatdozent at the Friedrich-Wilhelms-Universität Berlin (now Humboldt University of Berlin). A year later he became the First Assistant in the Physics department, but resigned from this position in 1893. After that, he again worked as a Privatdozent.

Via the land reform movement Arons came into contact with the SPD, which he joined in the early 1890s after some hesitation. As a member of the bourgeoisie he had particular reservations about the class struggle advocated by the party. The party's commitment to achieve its goals through legal means facilitated his entry. He subsequently wrote several articles for the party press. Within the party, he was on the reformists' side. He demanded the SPD's participation in the Prussian state elections and became an expert on the Prussian three-class franchise system. Since the 1890s he also attempted to unite middle-class social reformers and social democrats by organizing regular informal meetings, the Schmalzstullenclub ("Lard Bread Club"). He was a leading participant in the organization of the SPD's campaign for the general election of 1903. The press sometimes referred to him as the "Chief of Staff of the party for the election campaign." From 1904 to 1914 Arons was a member of the Berlin City Council. His candidacy for the post of alderman failed, however. Besides the party Arons also supported free trade unions and the building association "Ideal", founded in 1907.

Arons financed the first union hall in Berlin from his own assets, and small apartments for workers in conjunction with Ideal. From 1908, he increasingly withdrew from political life for health reasons.

He was a representative in the Berlin district of Neukölln, where the Aronsstraße was named after him in 1973 (called Leo-Arons-Straße from 1926 and 1934, and Sackführerdamm from 1934 to 1973).

== Lex Arons ==
Soon after Arons became a member of the Social Democratic Party, Prussian authorities sought to remove him from his teaching post. The university department responsible for carrying out this procedure objected to this request several times. A majority of the conservative members defended the autonomy of the university against state regulations. Their argument was that university teachers were free in their political beliefs and also that a Privatdozent was not subject to state discipline. As Arons spoke at the Social Democratic Party's congress in 1897, Kaiser Wilhelm II said, "I will not tolerate Socialists as ... the teachers of our youth at the Royal universities."

This royal declaration pressured the Prussian government and the reluctant official responsible for higher education, Friedrich Althoff, to bring about a solution. Since the government had no right to directly intervene in the appointment of lecturers, a law was passed in 1898 that made a lecturer subject to state disciplinary authority. Since this law was tailored especially for Arons' case, it is called the "Lex Arons". This law was one of the attempts in the 1890s to prevent the further advancement of the Social Democrats with exceptional laws. The Lex Arons was only one of these laws that passed the parliamentary hurdle of the Prussian House of Representatives; the Revolution Bill (1894) and the Jail Bill (1899) failed to find majorities in the Reichstag. Arons was suspended on the basis of the Lex Arons. Due to fear of clashes with the concerned departments, Arons' was the only case in which the law was used.

In public, and especially in the scientific community, the law sparked debates about the freedom of science. Immediately after the November Revolution, Arons was rehabilitated by the new government shortly before his death.
