= High-intensity discharge lamp =

Type of electric lamp/bulb

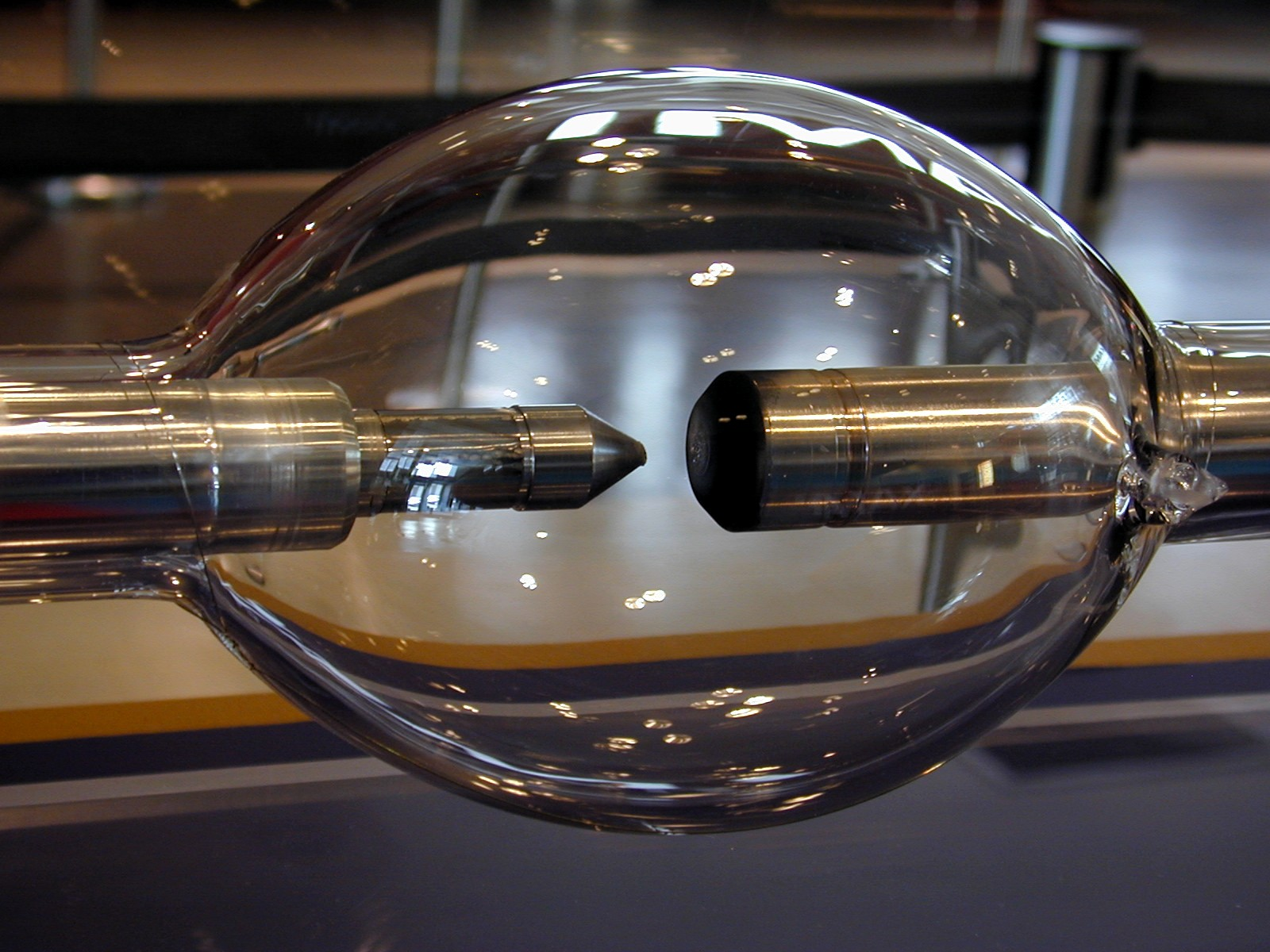
15 kW xenon short-arc lamp used in IMAX projectors

High-intensity discharge lamps (HID lamps) are a type of electrical gas-discharge lamp which produces light by means of an electric arc between tungsten electrodes housed inside a translucent or transparent fused quartz or fused alumina arc tube. This tube is filled with noble gas and often also contains suitable metal or metal salts, which emit the desired spectrum of light when excited (such as mercury, sodium, or sodium iodide). The noble gas enables the arc's initial strike. Once the arc is started, it heats and evaporates the metallic admixture. Its presence in the arc plasma greatly increases the intensity of visible light produced by the arc for a given power input, as the metals have many emission spectral lines in the visible part of the spectrum. High-intensity discharge lamps are a type of arc lamp.

Brand new high-intensity discharge lamps make more visible light per unit of electric power consumed than fluorescent and incandescent lamps, since a greater proportion of their radiation is visible light in contrast to infrared. However, the lumen output of HID lighting can deteriorate by up to 70% over 10,000 burning hours.

HID bulbs are commonly used in vehicle headlamps.

== Construction ==
Diagram of a high-pressure sodium lamp

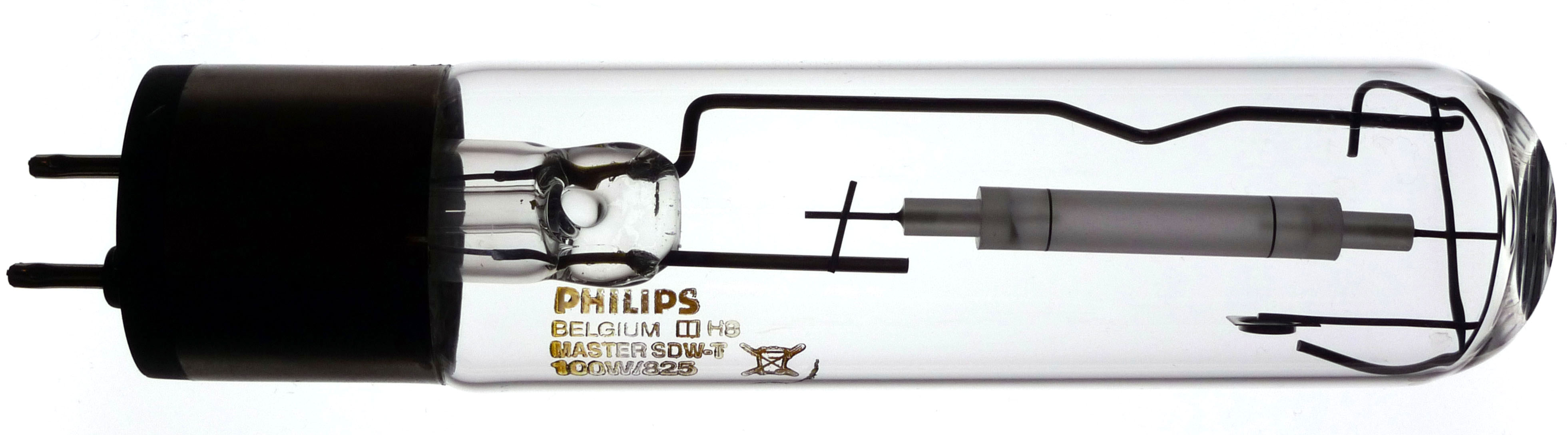
A high-pressure sodium lamp, Philips Master SDW-T 100W

Various types of chemistry are used in the arc tubes of HID lamps, depending on the desired characteristics of light intensity, correlated color temperature, color rendering index (CRI), energy efficiency, and lifespan. Varieties of HID lamp include:

- Mercury-vapor lamps
- Metal-halide (MH) lamps
- Ceramic MH lamps
- Sodium-vapor lamps
- Xenon short-arc lamps

The light-producing element of these lamp types is a well-stabilized arc discharge contained within a refractory envelope arc tube with wall loading in excess of 3 watts per square centimetre (19 W/in^{2}).

Mercury-vapor lamps were the first commercially available HID lamps. Originally they produced a bluish-green light, but more recent versions can produce light with a less pronounced color tint. However, mercury-vapor lamps are falling out of favor and being replaced by sodium-vapor and metal-halide lamps.

Metal-halide and ceramic metal-halide lamps can be made to give off neutral white light useful for applications where normal color appearance is critical, such as TV and movie production, indoor or nighttime sports games, automotive headlamps, and aquarium lighting.

Low-pressure sodium-vapor lamps are extremely efficient. They produce a deep yellow-orange light and have an effective CRI of nearly zero; items viewed under their light appear monochromatic. This makes them particularly effective as photographic safelights. High-pressure sodium lamps tend to produce a much whiter light, but still with a characteristic orange-pink cast. New color-corrected versions producing a whiter light are now available, but some efficiency is sacrificed for the improved color.

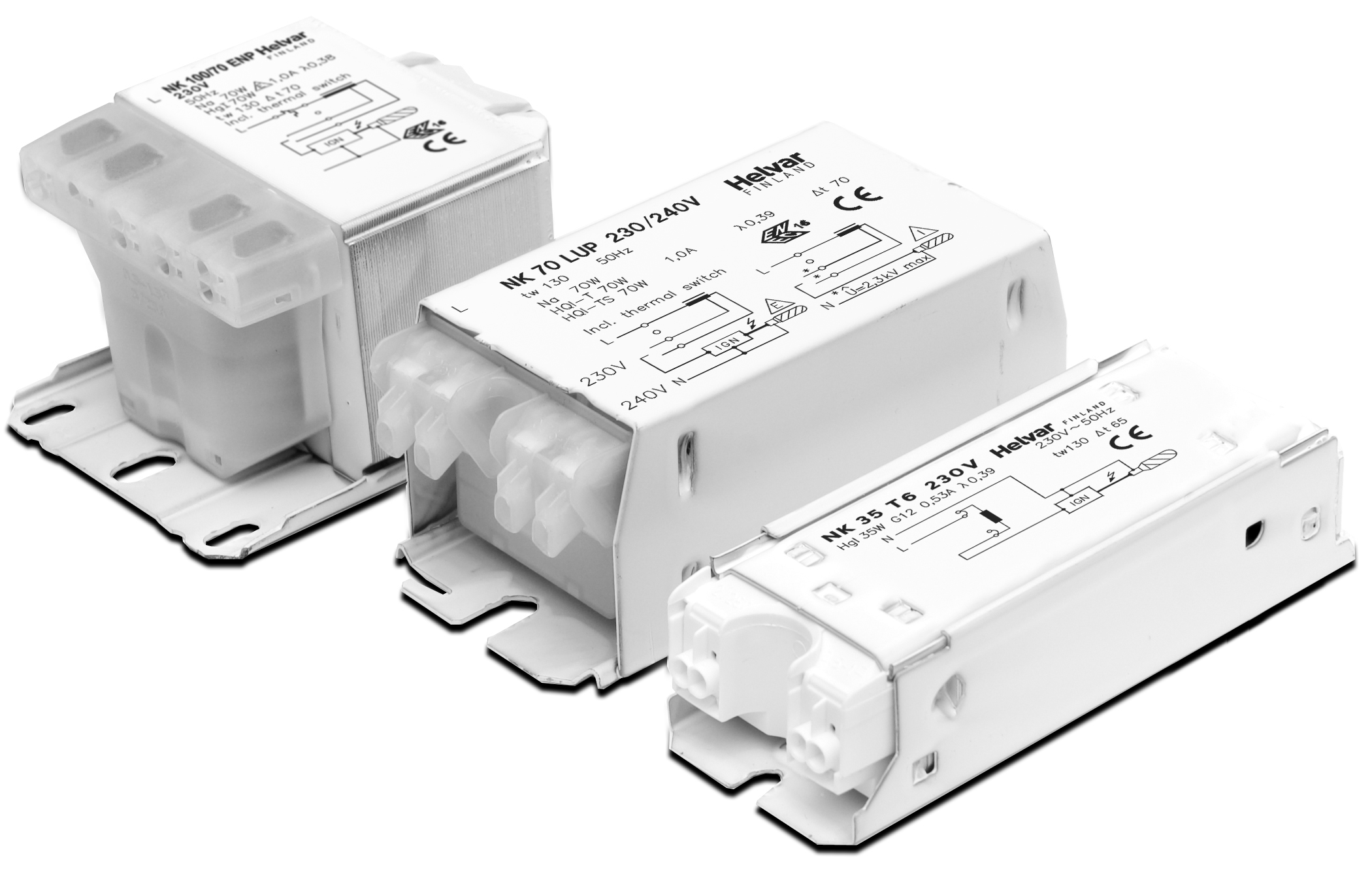
Ballasts for discharge lamps

Like fluorescent lamps, HID lamps require a ballast to start and maintain their arcs. The method used to initially strike the arc varies: mercury-vapor lamps and some metal-halide lamps are usually started using a third electrode near one of the main electrodes, while other lamp styles are usually started using pulses of high voltage.

Replacements for the toxic mercury in the HID lamps have been investigated and are a matter of ongoing research. Experiments show promising results and widespread future applications are expected.

== Radioactive substances ==
Some HID lamps make use of radioactive substances such as krypton-85 and thorium. These isotopes help start the lamps and improve lamp operating characteristics.

Krypton-85 is a gas and is found mixed in with the argon, which is in the arc tube of the lamp. The thorium, which is a solid, is used in the electrodes.

These isotopes produce ionizing radiation of alpha and beta type. This radiation causes high ionization inside the lamp without being able to escape from the lamp. High ionisation makes arc starting via Townsend avalanche much easier. Moreover, the presence of thorium in electrodes reduces the work function which again results in easier arc starting and sustaining.

The amount of gamma radiation produced by the isotopes that can escape from the lamp is negligible.

== Applications ==
HID lamps are typically used when high levels of light over large areas are required, and when energy efficiency and/or light intensity are desired. These areas include gymnasiums, large public areas, warehouses, movie theatres, football stadiums, outdoor activity areas, roadways, parking lots, and pathways. More recently, HID lamps have been used in small retail and even residential environments because of advances in reduced lumen bulbs. Ultra-high performance (UHP) HID lamps are used in LCD or DLP projection TV sets or projection displays as well.

HID lamps have made indoor gardening practical, particularly for plants that require high levels of direct sunlight in their natural habitat; HID lamps, specifically metal-halide and high-pressure sodium, are a common light source for indoor gardens. They are also used to reproduce tropical intensity sunlight for indoor aquaria.

Most HID lamps produce significant UV radiation and require UV-blocking filters to prevent UV-induced degradation of lamp fixture components and fading of dyed items illuminated by the lamp. Exposure to HID lamps operating with faulty or absent UV-blocking filters causes injury to humans and animals, such as sunburn and arc eye. Many HID lamps are designed to quickly extinguish if their outer UV-shielding glass envelope is broken.

Beginning in the early 1990s, HID lamps have seen applications in automotive headlamps. Xenon, or high-intensity discharge (HID), lighting provides brighter headlights and increases visibility of many peripheral objects (e.g. street signs and pedestrians) left in the shadows by standard halogen lighting. However, the bright headlights have given rise to complaints about glare.

HID lamps are used in high-performance bicycle headlamps, as well as flashlights and other portable lights, because they produce a great amount of light per unit of power. As the HID lights use less than half the power of an equivalent tungsten-halogen light, a significantly smaller and lighter-weight power supply can be used.

HID lamps have also become common on many aircraft as replacements for traditional landing and taxi lights.

HID lamps are also used in lamps for underwater diving. The higher efficacy of HID lamps compared to halogen units means longer burn times for a given battery size and light output.

== Color Temperatures ==
HID lamps are available in a variety of colors (commonly referred to as color temperatures) and measured in Kelvins (K). The Kelvin color temperature scale ranges from 1000K (amber) to 3000K (yellow) to 5500K (white) to 8000K (blue) to 12000K (purple).

HID Lamp Color Temperature Range

HID lamps produce different colors of light primarily through the use of various metal additives in the lamp's arc tube and the physics of the gas discharge process.

- Metal Additives: HID lamps contain an arc tube filled with a mixture of gases, including a noble gas (like xenon). These metal additives are crucial for producing different colors of light. Different metals emit light at specific wavelengths when energized, and this characteristic determines the lamp's color output.
- Gas Discharge Process: The lamp's operation involves creating an electric arc across the electrodes within the arc tube. This arc generates intense heat and excites the gases and metal additives within the tube. As the excited atoms return to their ground state, they release energy in the form of light.
- Spectrum Emission: The specific spectrum of light emitted depends on the energy levels of the excited atoms and the properties of the metal additives. Each metal emits light at certain wavelengths, resulting in specific colors
- Phosphor Coating: Some HID lamps, like Mercury Vapor lamps, also utilize phosphor coatings on the inner surface of the outer protective bulb. These phosphors absorb the ultraviolet (UV) light emitted by the excited gas atoms and then re-emit visible light. The combination of UV light and the emitted visible light creates a broader spectrum of colors.
- Color Rendering Index (CRI): HID lamps are not always known for their excellent color rendering properties. Color rendering refers to how accurately the light source displays the true colors of objects compared to natural sunlight. Different HID lamps have varying CRI values, with some providing better color rendering than others.

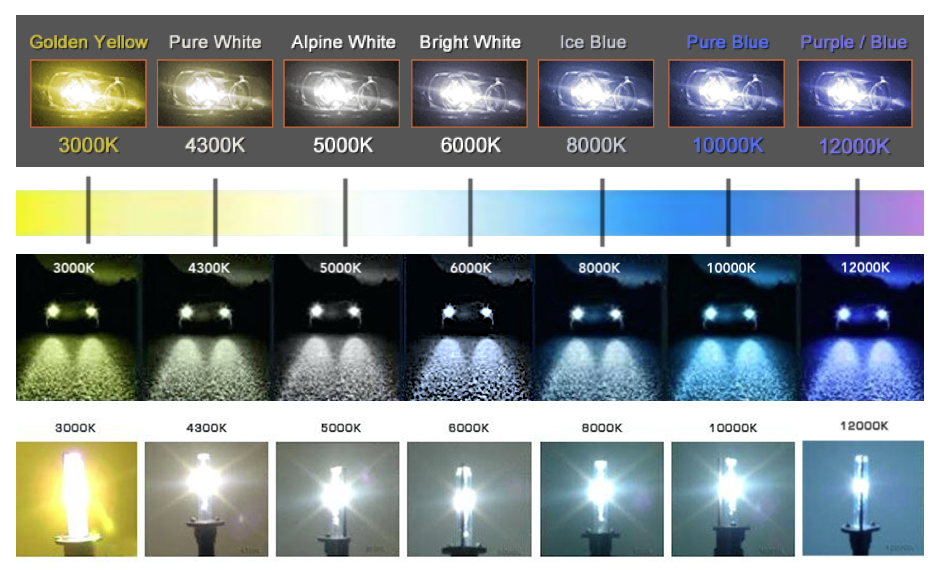
HID Headlamp Kelvin Chart

The choice of metal additives and their concentrations enables lamp manufacturers to create HID lamps with distinct color temperatures and spectral characteristics to meet different lighting needs.

The majority of HID lamps are produced in the color temperature range of 5000K to 6000K, which is similar to natural daylight. This is useful for applications requiring high levels of luminosity such as sport stadiums, warehouses, projection TVs, and gardening lights.

However, for certain applications such as automotive headlamps, HID lamps are produced in nearly every color from yellow and white to blue and purple.

== End of life ==
Factors of wear come mostly from on/off cycles versus the total on time. The highest wear occurs when the HID burner is ignited while still hot and before the metallic salts have recrystallized.

At the end of life, many types of high-intensity discharge lamps exhibit a phenomenon known as cycling. These lamps can be started at a relatively low voltage. As they heat up during operation, however, the internal gas pressure within the arc tube rises and a higher voltage is required to maintain the arc discharge. As a lamp gets older, the voltage necessary to maintain the arc eventually rises to exceed the voltage provided by the electrical ballast. As the lamp heats to this point, the arc fails and the lamp goes out. Eventually, with the arc extinguished, the lamp cools down again, the gas pressure in the arc tube is reduced, and the ballast can once again cause the arc to strike. The effect of this is that the lamp glows for a while and then goes out, repeatedly. More sophisticated ballast designs detect cycling and give up attempting to start the lamp after a few cycles. If power is removed and reapplied, the ballast will make a new series of startup attempts.

Another phenomenon associated with HID lamp wear and aging is discoloration of the emitted light beam ("fading"). Commonly, a shift towards blue and/or violet can be observed. This shift is slight at first and is more generally a sign of the lamps being "broken in" whilst still being in good overall working order, but towards the end of its life, the HID lamp is often perceived as only producing blue and violet light. Based on Planck's law, this is a direct result of the increased voltage and higher temperature necessary to maintain the arc.

Sometimes the quartz tube containing mercury can explode in a UHP lamp. When that happens, up to 50 mg of mercury vapor is released into the atmosphere. This quantity of mercury is potentially toxic, but the main hazard from broken lamps is glass cuts, and occasional exposure to broken lamps is not expected to have adverse effects. Philips recommends the use of a mercury vacuum cleaner, ventilation or respiratory protection, eye protection, and protective clothing when dealing with broken lamps. Mercury lamps always require specialised disposal or recycling, which is legally mandatory in many locations depending on jurisdiction.
