= Ultra-high-performance lamp =

High-pressure mercury arc lamp

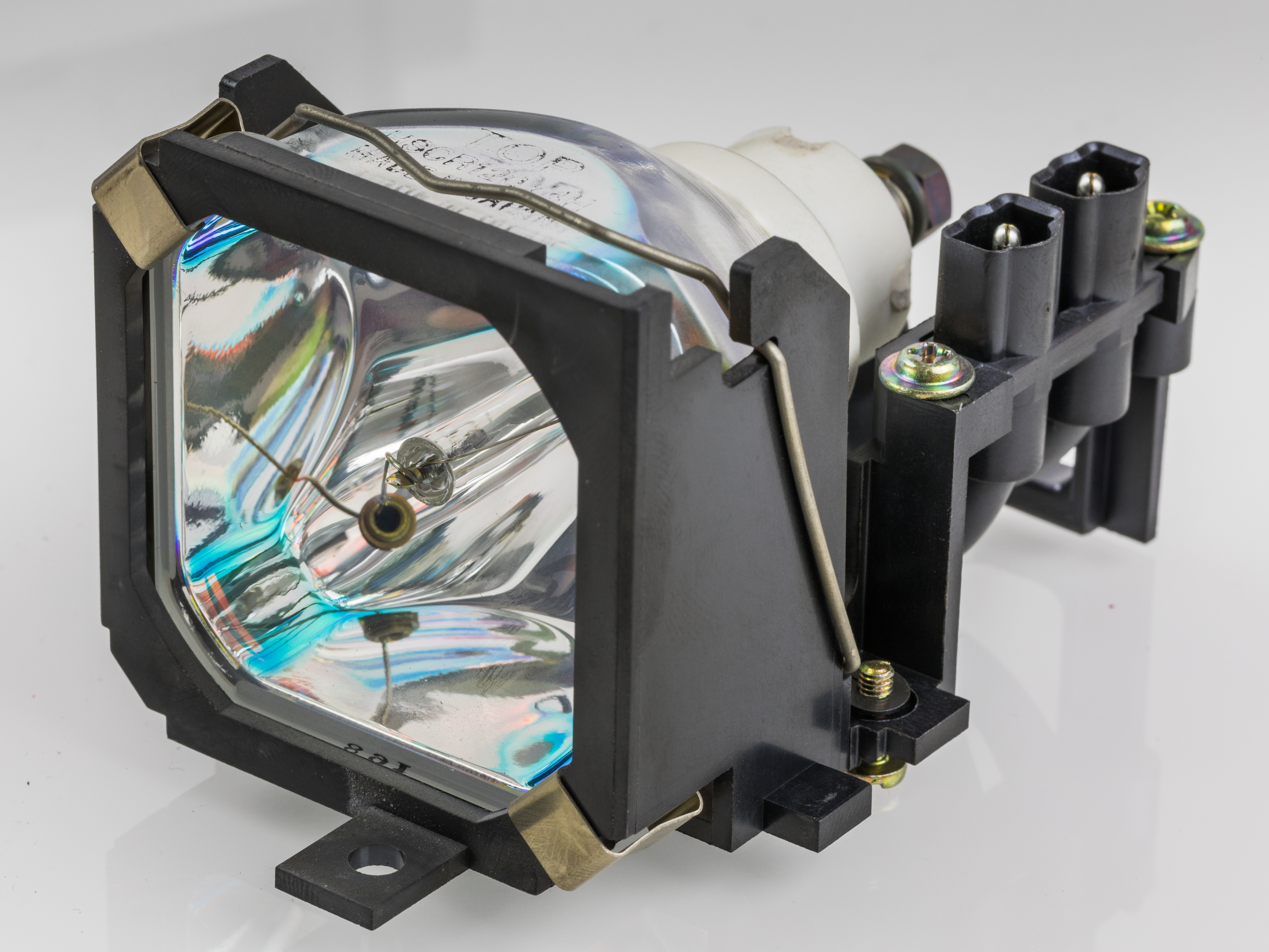
Ultra-high-performance lamp

An ultra-high-performance lamp, often known by the Philips trademark UHP, is a high-pressure mercury arc lamp. These were originally known as ultra-high-pressure lamps, because the internal pressure can rise to as much as 200 atmospheres when the lamp reaches its operating temperature. It was developed by Philips in 1995 for use in commercial projection systems, home theatre projectors, MD-PTVs and video walls. Unlike other common mercury vapor lamps used in projection systems, it is not a metal halide lamp, as it uses only mercury. Philips claims a lifetime of over 10,000 hours for the lamps. These lamps are highly efficient compared to other projection lamps – a single 132 watt UHP lamp is used by DLP manufacturers such as Samsung and RCA to power their DLP rear-projection TV lines. It is used in many LCD and DLP video projectors.

== Known manufacturers of high-pressure discharge lamps (UHP or similar) ==
- EYE/Iwasaki (HSCR) (AC only), Japan based.
- Osram/Sylvania (P-VIP / NeoLux) (AC only), Europe based company.
- Panasonic, Matsushita (HS, UHM) (AC only), Japan based company.
- Philips (UHP) (AC only), Europe based company.
- Phoenix (SHP), Japan based company.
- Ushio (NSH, UMPRD, NSHA), Japan based company.
- Epson (E-TORL) (Made by EYE/Iwasaki), Japan based company.
- In the initial UHP lamp development stage, Philips and Osram took a lead, and focused on AC (alternate current) technology and has cross patent sharing with each other. As a result, Japanese companies focuses on DC (direct current) technology to bypass European patents.

== Counterfeits ==
Manufacturers mostly in China have been reported to be making inferior counterfeit lamps. In the UK, one lamp distributor was prosecuted for supplying counterfeit Epson lamps that seriously damaged an Epson projector in Germany.

As an increasing number of counterfeit lamps are being sold, projector manufacturers, such as Optoma and Epson stress the importance of authentic and original lamps. Optoma and Epson hold the biggest projector market share in DLP and LCD respectively.

== Devices using UHP lamps ==
- Samsung DLP rear-projection TV sets.
- Sony LCD rear-projection TV sets.
- Most digital projectors manufactured post 2001 (except LED projectors)
- Olympus ILP-2 high-intensity light source
- Mitsubishi DLP projection televisions
- Barco Sim7 series LCoS simulation projectors
- Epson LCD projectors
- Acer DLP projectors
- Moving Head Fixtures
- Golf Simulators - Typically Short Throw Projectors
- Video Walls

== See also ==
- Hydrargyrum medium-arc iodide lamp
