= Mogul lamp =

Type of floor lamp

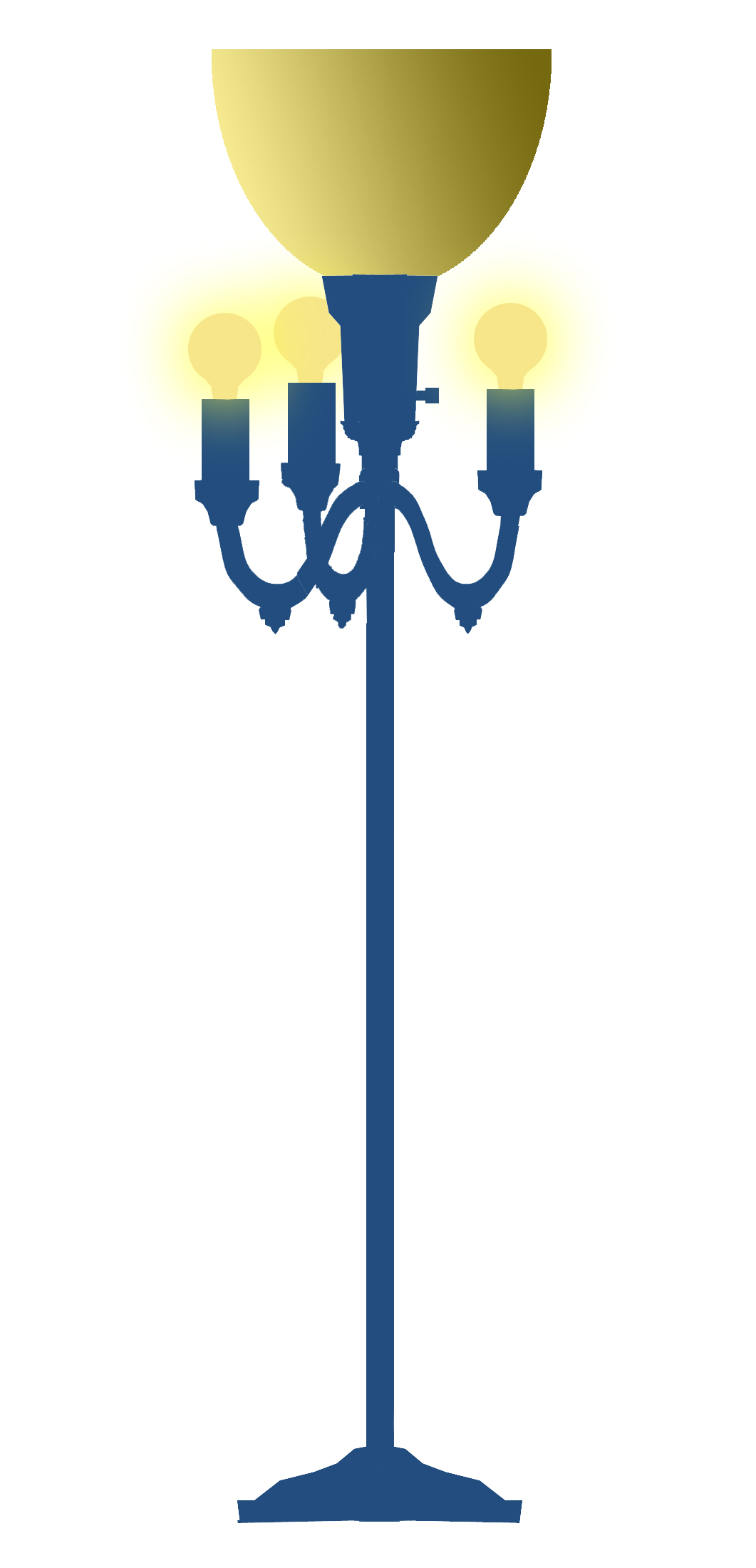
A typical mogul floor lamp

A mogul lamp or six way lamp is a floor lamp which has a large center light bulb surrounded by three (or four) smaller bulbs that may be candelabra-style or standard medium-base bulbs, each mounted base-down. This entire setting is typically covered, at least partially, by a large cylindrical (or bell-shaped) fabric shade which is fitted over the reflector bowl, an upturned, white-colored glass, hemispherical diffuser surrounding the center bulb. The top of the lamp is usually designed to sit just above eye-level of an average adult person standing next to it, to avoid unpleasant glare from unshaded bulbs.

== Etymology ==
The word "mogul" originates from Persian, where it's used to describe Mongols. It was adopted into English in the 16th century and initially referred to the rulers of the Mughal Empire in India, who were considered powerful and influential. Later, the term expanded to encompass any powerful or wealthy person, particularly in the business world.

== Details ==
The bulb socket in the center has a larger diameter (an E39 or E40 mogul base) than a regular E26 or E27 Edison screw light socket, and is typically made of cast porcelain for the higher temperatures. Mogul-base lamps are available for industrial use in larger power ratings (250–1500) and in halogen, mercury vapor, high-pressure sodium and metal-halide lamp configurations. Compact fluorescent mogul-base bulbs are also available, as are adaptors to allow medium-base bulbs to be used in mogul sockets.

There are usually two three-way switches near the top of the floor lamp to operate the bulbs. One controls the three-way center bulb, and the other turns on one, two, or all three (or four) of the peripheral bulbs. The center bulb may be very high power (often a three-way, 100-200-300 watt bulb), where the others are usually 60 watts or less. Some models have a night light in the base operated by a foot switch. One model turns the current light settings on or off by moving the lamp pole up or down.

This design allows sixteen different combinations of brightness to be obtained. The result is that one lamp can provide a very soft, diffuse glow or quickly adjusted to illuminate an entire room, and everything in between.

Popular in the 1920s and 1930s, mogul lamps can be obtained in thrift or antique stores and can still be purchased new.

== Mogul lamps and mathematics ==
Mogul lamps are also the subject of a mathematics problem concerning the number of possible combinations of power that can be obtained. As it turns out, the name "Six Way Lamp" is somewhat deceiving since there are in fact 16 possible combinations (without the night-light), including combinations with all lamps of either switch off. The term probably comes from the fact that the design incorporates two "three-way" switches.

== See also ==
- Floor lamp
