= GU24 lamp fitting =

Electrical connection standard for fluorescent lamps

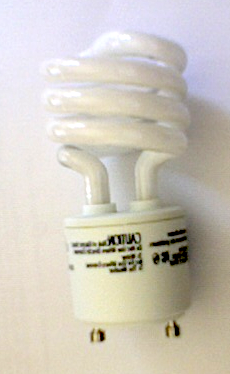
Compact fluorescent lamp with GU24 cap

A GU24 lamp fitting is a bi-pin connector for compact fluorescent lamps (CFL) or LED lamps that uses a bayonet mount–like twist-lock bi-pin connector instead of the Edison screw fitting used on many CFLs, LED lamps and incandescent light bulbs. The design was initiated by the U.S. EPA and the Lighting Research Center in 2004, in order to facilitate the deployment of compact fluorescent light bulbs with replaceable ballasts.

The GU24 fitting is compliant with a 2008 ruling by the California Energy Commission under Title 24 (California Building Standards Code) to require high-efficiency lighting on all residential remodels and new construction. The GU24 fitting is intended to maintain the energy efficiency of the light by preventing an occupant from using an incandescent bulb instead of a CFL. Adapters to use incandescent bulbs in a GU24 fitting are illegal in the State of California as they would be a fire hazard in fixtures designed for the lower heat output of a CFL bulb.

As of January 2017, GU24 fittings are no longer required for ENERGY STAR or California Energy Code compliance.

== Advantages ==
- The GU24 fitting allows the overall length of the bulb to be shorter since the threaded base is eliminated.
- Neither of the electrical contacts is exposed during bulb installation or when in service, offering improved protection against electric shock.

== Disadvantages ==
- Requires proper alignment to install: most bulbs and sockets make alignment more difficult by obscuring the pin orientation.
- No 3-way lamp support.
- Incompatibility with other bulb types.
- Will maintain a price premium while they are mandated in a minority of jurisdictions.
- While the pins' spacing is standardized, there is no standard for base width. Some fixtures shroud or recess the socket, assuming base dimensions of the bulbs they came with.
