= 3-way lamp =

Light bulb with three brightness levels

A 3-way lamp, also known as a tri-light, is a lamp that uses a 3-way light bulb to produce three levels of light in a low-medium-high configuration. A 3-way lamp requires a 3-way bulb and socket, and a 3-way switch.

In 3-way incandescent light bulbs, each of the filaments operates at full voltage. Lamp bulbs with dual carbon filaments were built as early as 1902 to allow adjustable lighting levels.

Certain compact fluorescent lamp bulbs are designed to replace 3-way incandescent bulbs, and have an extra contact and circuitry to dim to a similar light level. In recent years, LED 3-way bulbs have become available as well.

== 3-way bulbs ==
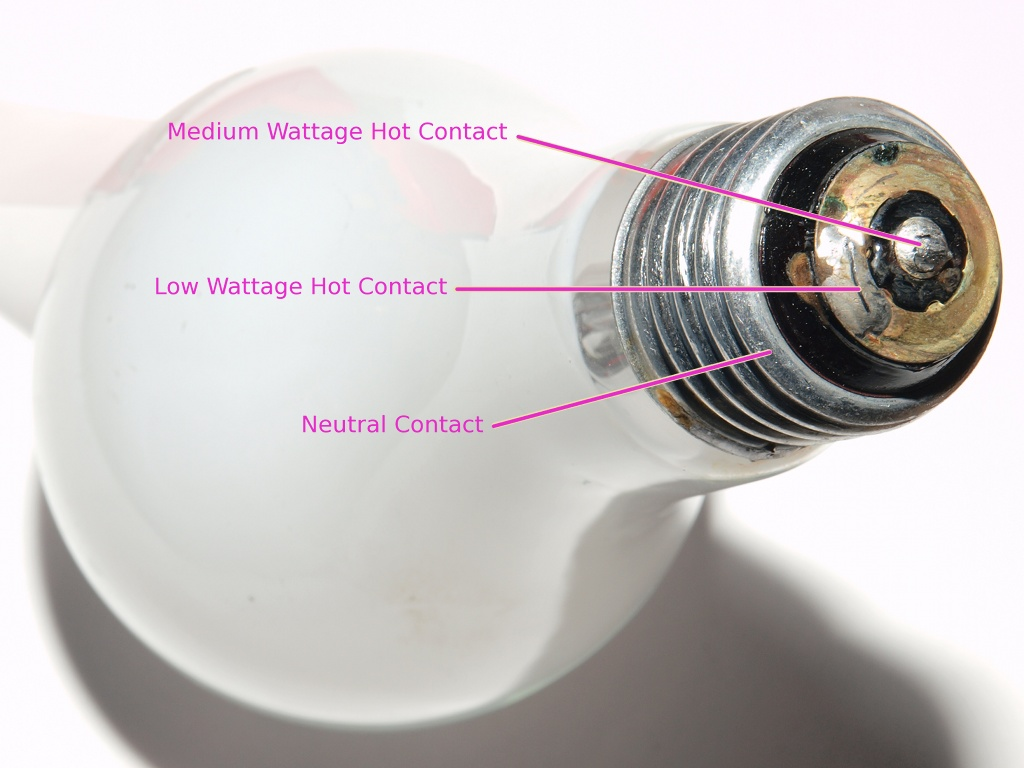
The contacts of a 3-way bulb

Circuit diagram of a 3-way bulb

A 3-way incandescent bulb has two filaments designed to produce different amounts of light. The two filaments can be activated separately or together, giving three different amounts of light. One common 3-way incandescent bulb is the 50/100/150 W. It has a low-power 50 W filament and a medium-power 100 W filament. When they are both energized at the same time, 150 W of power is delivered, and a high level of light is produced. Usually screw-base 3-way bulbs fit into regular Type A sockets (E26D after ISO 60061-1:2014). Larger 3-way bulbs (up to 300 W) have a larger "mogul" base (E39D). These 3-way bulbs can also come in spiral-shaped compact fluorescent lamps.

== 3-way sockets ==
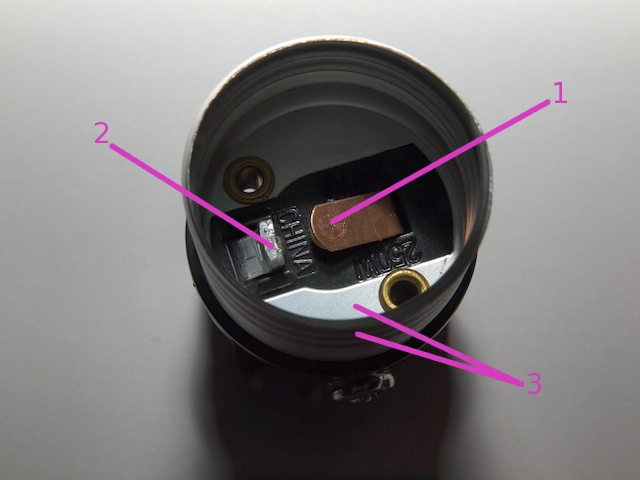
Inside a 3-way socket

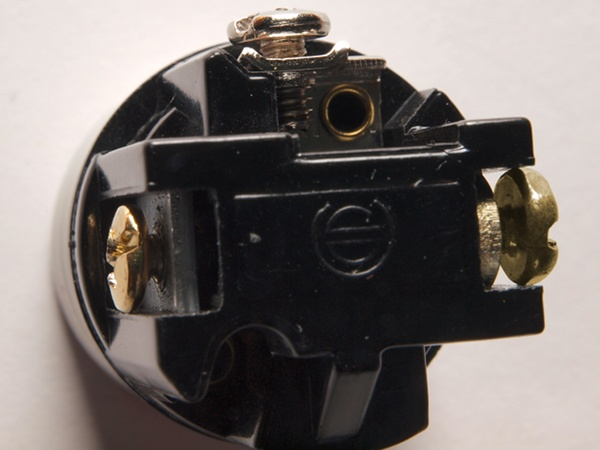
The base of a keyless 3-way socket

A standard screw lamp socket has only two electrical contacts. In the center of the bottom of a standard socket is the hot contact (contact one in photo), which typically looks like a small metal tongue bent over. The threaded metal shell is itself the neutral contact (contact three in photo). When a standard bulb is screwed into a standard socket, a matching contact on the bottom of the bulb presses against the metal tongue in the center of the socket, creating the live connection. The metal threads of the bulb base touch the socket shell, which creates the neutral connection, and this is how the electrical circuit is completed.

A 3-way socket has three electrical contacts. In addition to the two contacts of the standard socket, a third contact is added. This contact is positioned off-center in the bottom of the socket (contact two in photo). This extra contact matches a ring-shaped contact on the bottom of a 3-way bulb, which creates the connection for the second filament inside the bulb. A problem of these devices is that the ring contact of the socket (contact two in photo) digs into the lead seal on the lamp bulb's contact ring and this connection tends to fail early (sometimes in months), leading to intermittent flashes, popping noises, and loss of power to the low wattage filament as the lead seal on the bulb's ring alternately melts and solidifies.

The center contact of the bulb typically connects to the medium-power filament, and the ring connects to the low-power filament. Thus, if a 3-way bulb is screwed into a standard light socket that has only a center contact, only the medium-power filament operates. In the case of the 50/100/150 W bulb, putting this bulb in a regular lamp socket will result in it behaving like a normal 100 W bulb.

A key switch 3-way socket has the switch incorporated in the lamp socket and requires no external wiring between switch and socket. This would be typical in a 3-way floor-standing floor lamp. A 3-way socket that is to be wired to a separate 3-way 2-circuit switch, is called a keyless 3-way socket.

Circuit diagram of a 3-way switch and socket

Lamp function	Switch one	Switch two
Off	Off	Off
Low, lamp one	On	Off
Medium, lamp two	Off	On
High, lamps one and two	On	On

== Development in the U.S. ==
General Electric announced its newly-developed 3-way bulb in 1933. They were at first manufactured in two sizes: “one containing 150- and 200-watt filaments; and the other 200- and 300-watt filaments.” And the new bulbs were not initially marketed to consumers: “It is anticipated that the new lamp will find its first application in the field of commercial lighting, particularly the small and medium-sized establishments which have definite peaks and low points in the volume of store traffic.”

By 1935, dual-filament lamps for home use were offered with 3-way incandescent bulbs in two wattage combinations, 50-100-150 and 100-200-300 watts.

== See also ==
- Multiway switching, interconnection of two or more electrical switches to control an electrical load from more than one location
- Pull switch, switch operated with pull chain found on ceiling fans
- Rotary switch, type of mechanical device
