= Bayonet mount =

Fastening mechanism

A bayonet mount

A bayonet mount before and after insertion

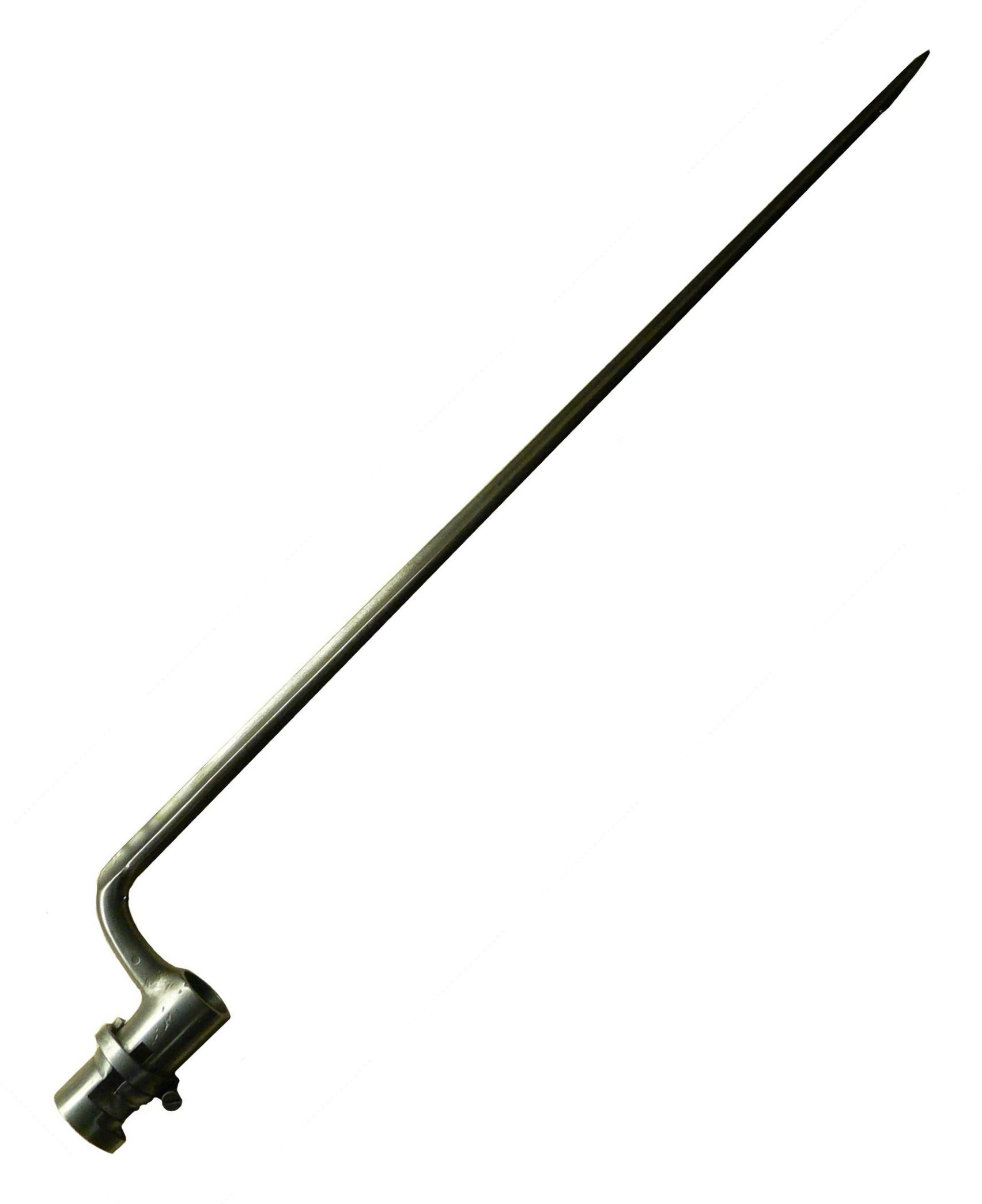
Early-19th century socket bayonet

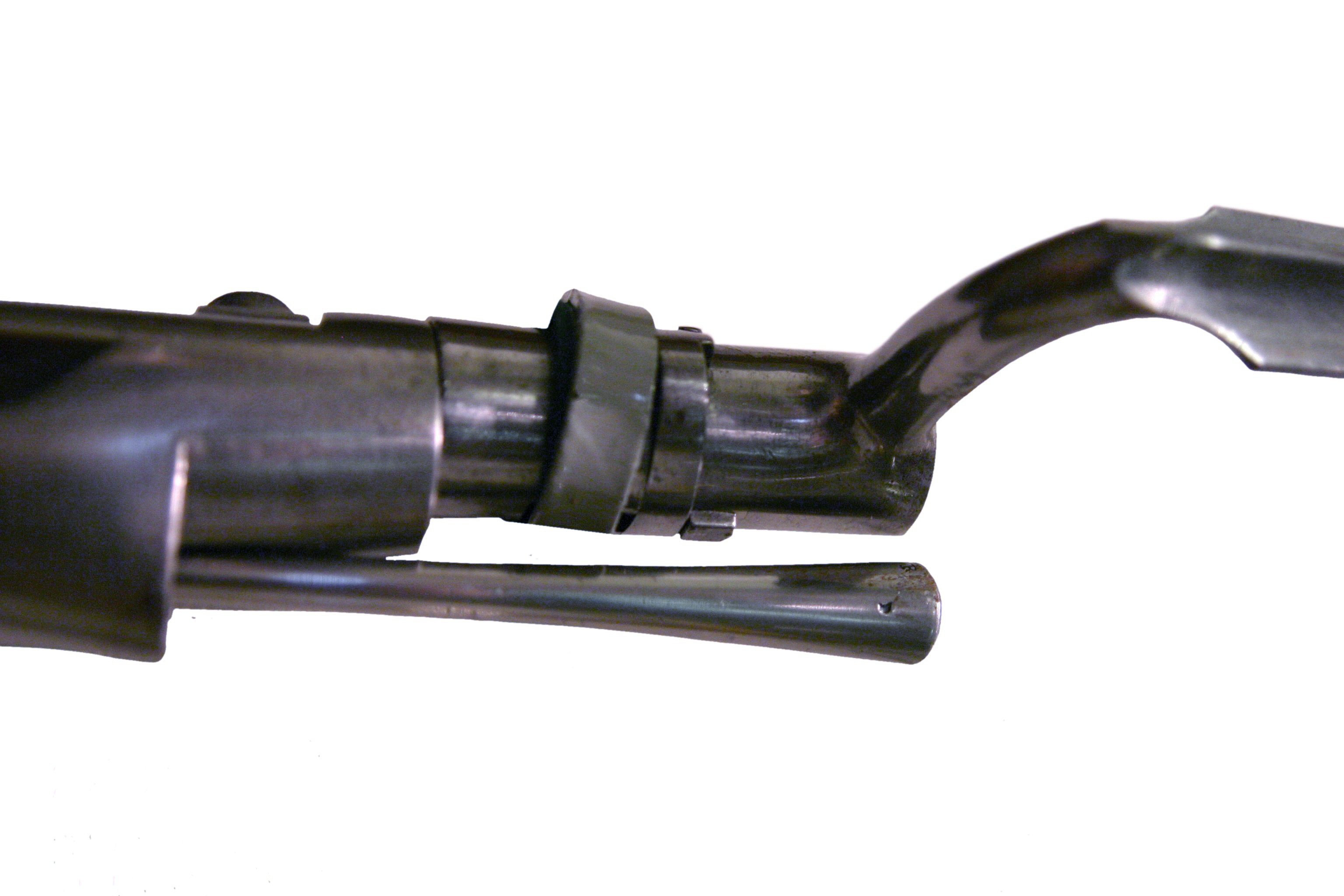
Socket of a bayonet

A bayonet mount (mainly as a method of mechanical attachment, such as fitting a lens to a camera using a matching lens mount) or bayonet connector (for electrical use) is a fastening mechanism consisting of a cylindrical male side with one or more radial pegs, and a female receptor with matching L-shaped slot(s) and with spring(s) to keep the two parts locked together. The slots are shaped like a capital letter L with serif (a short upward segment at the end of the horizontal arm); the peg slides into the vertical arm of the L, rotates across the horizontal arm, then is pushed slightly upwards into the short vertical "serif" by the spring; the connector is no longer free to rotate unless pushed down against the spring until the peg is out of the "serif".

The bayonet mount is the standard light bulb fitting in the United Kingdom and in many countries that were members of the British Empire including Australia, Hong Kong, Fiji, India, Pakistan, Sri Lanka, Ireland and New Zealand, parts of the Middle East and Africa and, historically, in France and Greece.

== Design ==
To couple the two parts, the pin(s) on the male are aligned with the slot(s) on the female and the two pushed together. Once the pins reach the bottom of the slot, one or both parts are rotated so that the pin slides along the horizontal arm of the L until it reaches the "serif". The spring then pushes the male connector up into the "serif" to keep the pin locked into place. A practised user can connect them quickly and, unlike screw connectors, they are not subject to cross-threading. To disconnect, the two parts are pushed together to move the pin out of the "serif" while twisting in the opposite direction than for connecting, and then pulling apart.

The strength of the joint comes from the strength of the pins and the L slots, and the spring. To disengage unintentionally, the pins must break, the sleeve into which the connector slides must be distorted or torn enough to free the pins, or the spring must fail and allow the connector to be pushed down and rotate—for example due to vibration.

It is possible to push down the connector and rotate it, but not far enough to engage and lock; it will stay in place temporarily, but accidental disconnection is very likely.

Bayonet electrical connectors are used in the same applications where other connectors are used, to transmit either power or signals. Bayonet connections can be made faster than screw connections, and more securely than push-fit connections; they are more resistant to vibration than both these types. They may be used to connect two cables, or to connect a cable to a connector on the panel of a piece of equipment.

The coupling system is usually made of two bayonet ramps machined on the external side of the receptacle connector and 2 stainless steel studs mounted inside the plug connector's coupling nut. Several classes of electrical cable connectors, including audio, video, and data cables use bayonet connectors. Examples include BNC, C, and ST connectors. (The BNC connector is not exactly as described in this article, as the male, not female, connector has the slots and spring.)

The GU-10 light fittings in common use for both halogen and LED miniature spotlight lamps have a similar means of connection but the retaining pins are fitted to the end of the lamp and also double as the electrical contacts. The pins are cylindrical but the ends have a larger diameter, resembling a T when viewed from the side. The receptacle has two slots resembling curved keyholes which have holes at one end sized to accept the pin ends. The lamp is inserted into the receptacle by placing the pins in the holes and rotating in a clockwise direction. Note that, unlike the traditional bayonet fitting, the retaining springs act laterally on the pins so no inward pressure is required to lock the lamp in the fitting. GU-10 fittings are available in heat-resistant form for use with halogen lamps which generate heat.

== History ==
The first documented use of this type of fitting (without the name "bayonet") may be by al-Jazari in the 13th century, who used it to mount candles into his candle-clocks. This type of fitting was later used for soldiers who needed to quickly mount bayonets to the ends of their rifles, hence the name.

== Light bulbs ==
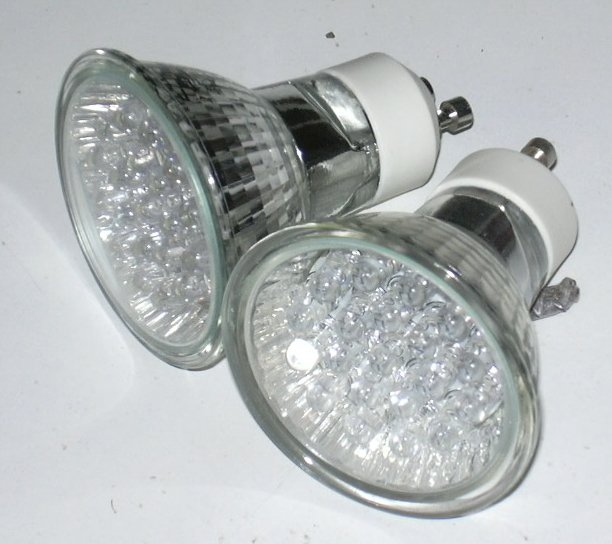
LED lamps with GU10 bi-pin twist-lock mount

Compact fluorescent lamp with double contact B22d bayonet mount

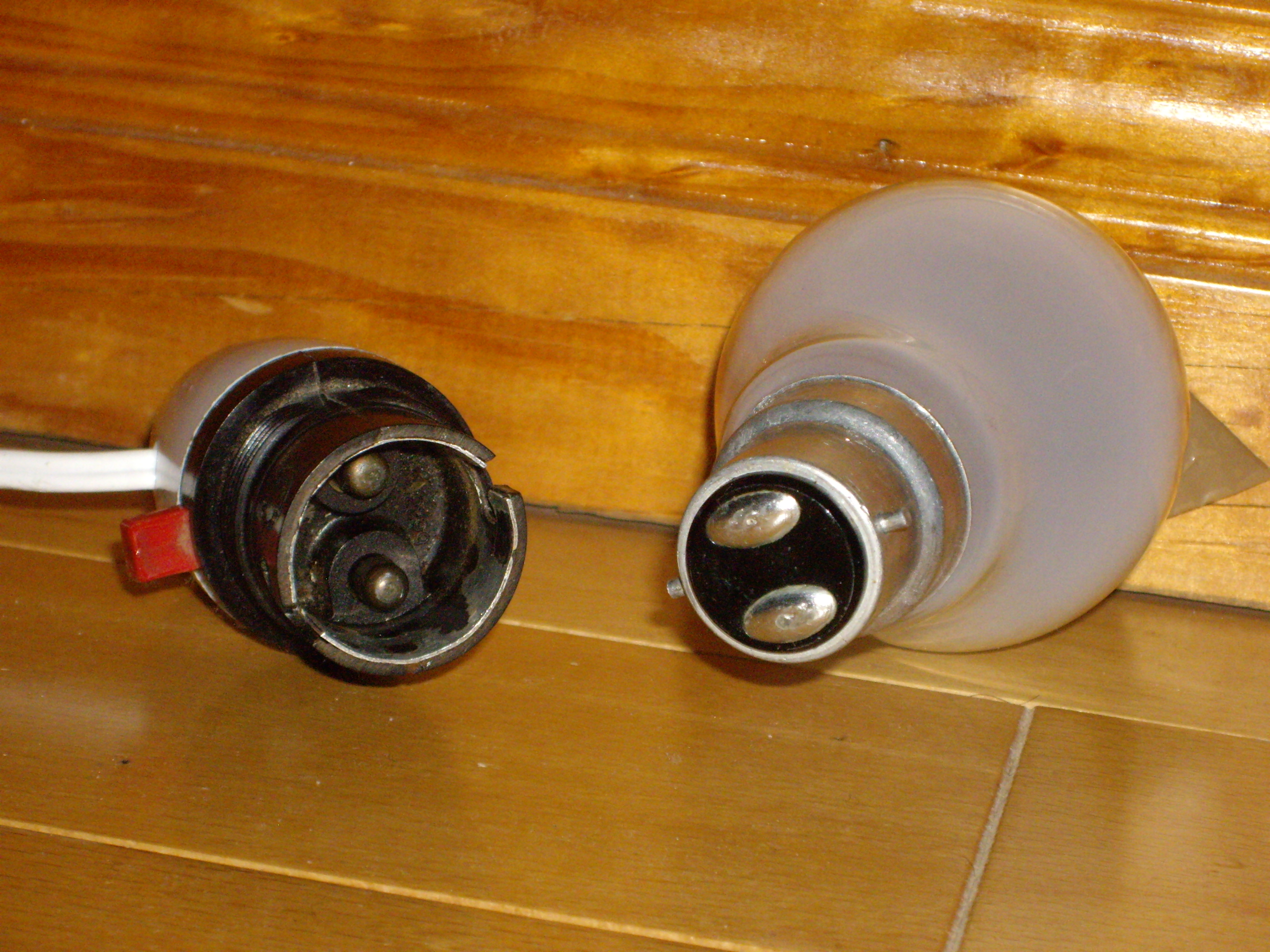
Incandescent light bulb with double contact B22d bayonet mount, and corresponding socket with sprung connectors

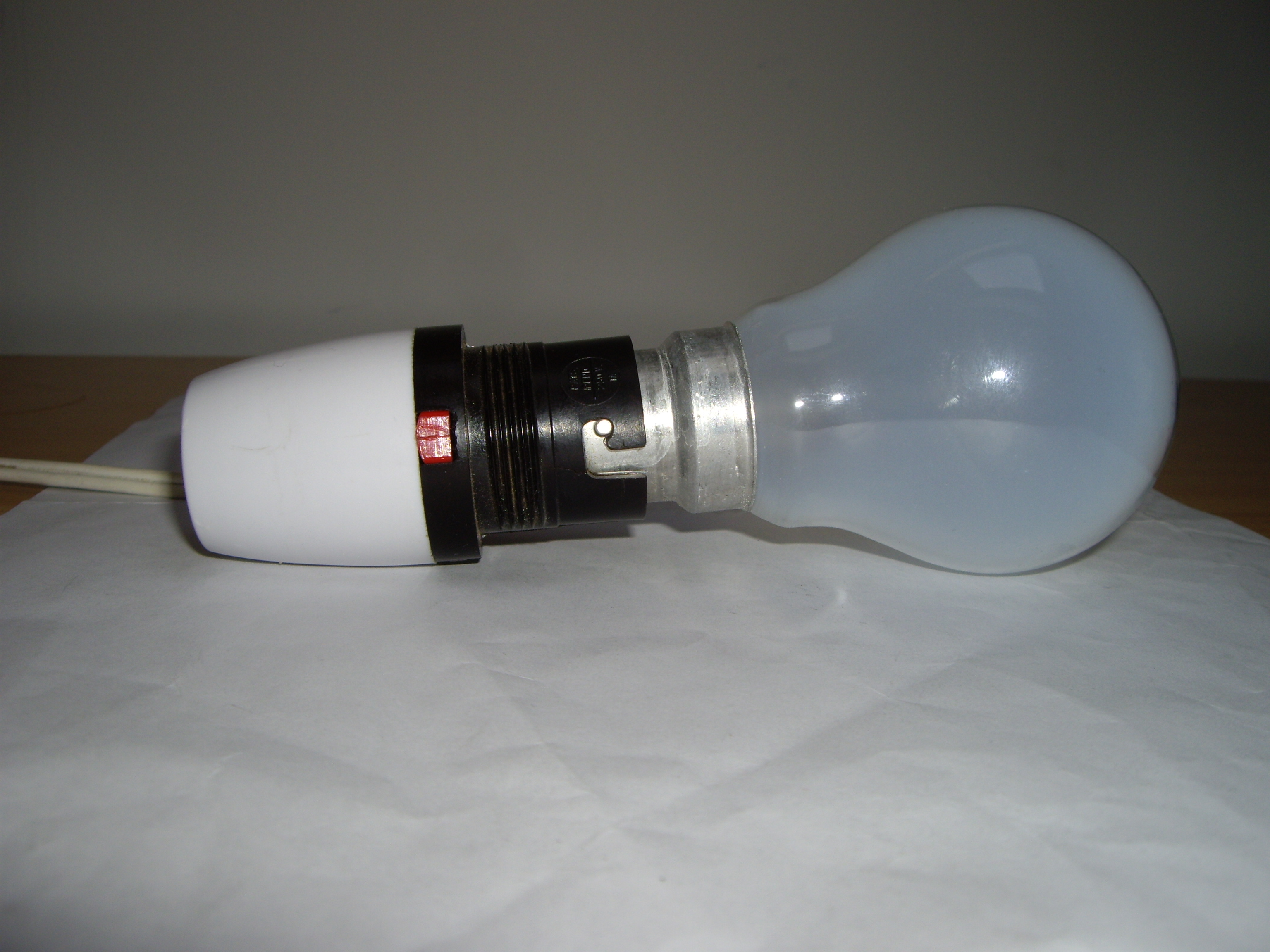
Preceding bulb mounted in the socket

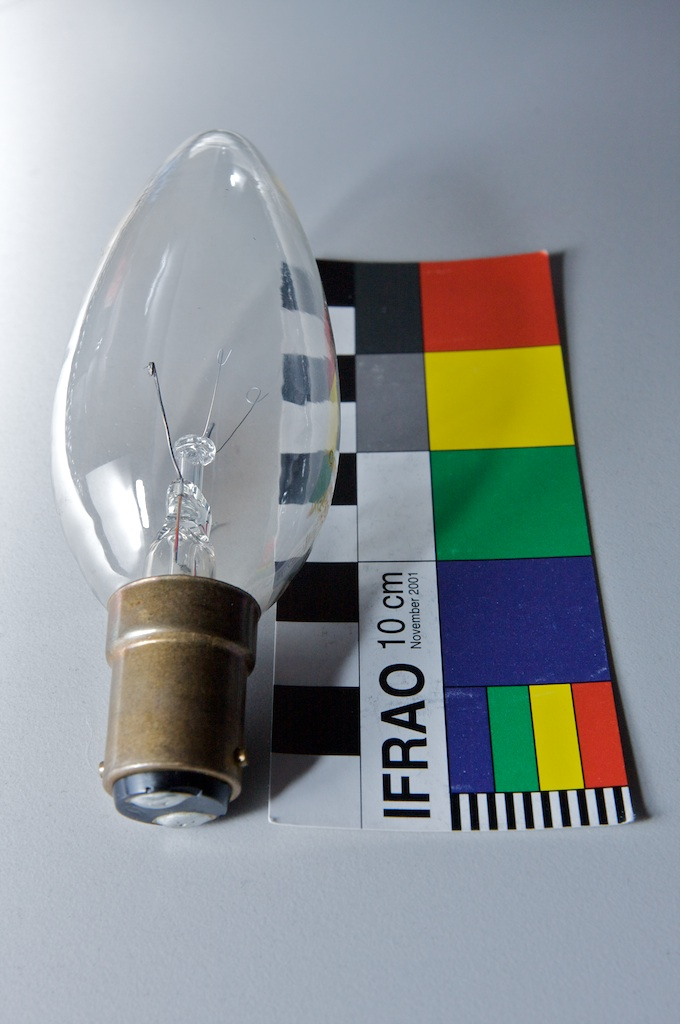
Incandescent 40 W BA15d bulb

The bayonet light bulb mount is the standard fitting in many former members of the British Empire including the United Kingdom, Australia, India, Ireland, and New Zealand, Hong Kong, as well as parts of the Middle East and Africa (although not Canada, which primarily uses Edison screw sockets along with the United States and Mexico). The standard size is B22d-2, often referred to in the context of lighting as simply BC or B22. Older installations in some other countries, including France and Greece use this base. First developed by St. George Lane Fox-Pitt in the UK and improved upon by the Brush Electric Company from the late 1870s onward, standard bulbs have two pins on opposite sides of the cap; however, some specialized bulbs have three pins (cap designation B22d-3) to prevent use in domestic light fittings. Examples of three-pin bulbs are found in mercury street lamps and fireglow bulbs in some older models of electric radiative heater. Older railway carriages in the UK also made use of a 3 pin bulb base to discourage theft. Bayonet cap bulbs are also very common worldwide in applications where vibration may loosen screw-mount bulbs, such as automotive lighting and other small indicators, and in many flashlights. In many other countries the Edison screw (E) base is used for lighting.

Some bulbs may have slightly offset lugs to ensure they can be only inserted in one orientation, for example the 1157 automobile tail-light which has two different filaments to act as both a tail light and a brake light. In this bulb each filament has a different brightness and is connected to a separate contact on the bottom of the base; the two contacts are symmetrically positioned about the axis of the base, but the pins are offset so that the bulb can only be fitted in the correct orientation. Newer bulbs use a wedge base which can be inserted either way without complication. Some special-purpose bulbs, such as infra-red, have 3 pins 120 degrees apart to prevent them being used in any but the intended socket.

Bayonet bases or caps are often abbreviated to BA, often with a number after. The number refers to the diameter of the base (e.g., BA22 is a 22 mm diameter bayonet cap lamp). BA15, a 15 mm base, can also be referred to as SBC standing for small bayonet cap. The lower-case letter s or d specifies whether the bulb has single or double contacts. The entries from the table below pertain to IEC 60061 "Lamp caps and holders together with gauges for the control of interchangeability and safety" and to DIN 49xxx. (Note: See Replaces list under Amendments section)

| Designation | IEC | DIN (Note: In June 1996, all were withdrawn and replaced by DIN EN 60061-1) | ANSI |
|---|---|---|---|
| BA7 | 7004–15–2 | 49710 | |
| B8.4d & BX8.4d | 7004–140–1 | | |
| BA9 | 7004–14–9 | | |
| BA9s | | 49715 | |
| BAX9s | 7004–8–1 | 49640–21 | |
| BAY9s | 7004–9–1 | 49640–22 | |
| BAU9s | 7004-150A-1 | | |
| BAUZ9s | 7004-150B-1 | | |
| BAW9s | 7004–149–1 | | |
| BAZ9s | 7004–150–1 | | |
| B15s | | 49721 | |
| B15d | 7004–18–1 | 49721 | |
| BA15 | 7004-11A-10 | 49720 | |
| BAU15 | 7004–19–2 | | |
| BAU15s | | 49720–5 | |
| BAW15 | 7004-11E-1 | | |
| BAX15d | 7004–18–1 | 49720–3 | |
| BAY15d | 7004-11B-7 | 49720–2 | |
| BAZ15 | 7004-11C-3 | | |
| BAZ15d | | 49720–4 | |
| BA15s-3(100°/130°) | 7004-11D-1 | | |
| BA15d-3(100°/130°) | 7004–173–1 | | |
| BA20 | 7004–12–7 | 49730 | |
| BA21-3(120°) | 7004–13–4 | | |
| B22s | | 49740 | |
| B22d | 7004–10–7 | 49740 | |
| B22d-3(90°/135°)/25x26 | 7004-10A-2 | | |
| BY22d | 7004–17–3 | | |

These are the available sizes in the UK:

| Designation | Alternative designation | Contacts | Dimension, etc. |
|---|---|---|---|
| BA5s | | 1 | 5 mm |
| BA7s | | 1 | 7 mm, elongated pins |
| BAX9s | | 1 | 9 mm, radially offset pins |
| BA9s | Miniature bayonet cap (MBC) | 1 | 9 mm |
| BA15d | Small bayonet cap (SBC) | 2 | 15 mm |
| BAY15d (P21/5W, 1157) | | 2 | 15 mm, axially offset pins |
| BAX15s | | 1 | 15 mm, radially offset pins |
| BA15s (P21W/1156/R5W/R10W) | Single centre contact (SCC) | 1 | 15 mm |
| BA20s | | 1 | 20 mm |
| BA20d | | 2 | 20 mm |
| BA21d | | 2 | 21 mm |
| B21-4 | | | 21 mm 4 pin |
| BA22d | Bayonet cap (BC) | 2 | 22 mm |
| BC-3 | Bayonet cap (BC) | 2 | 22 mm 3 bayonet pins |
| B22d-3 | | 2 | 22 mm double ended (railway) |
| BX22d | | 2 | 22 mm |

Of these, only the BC (BA22d, often abbreviated as B22) is widely used in homes. Formerly, some linear fluorescent lamps in the UK used BA22d end caps, owing to material shortages arising from the Second World War, which prevented the development of the bi-pin cap design that was becoming commonplace elsewhere in the world; notably, in the United States. Production of these lamps continued until the early 1980s, although manufacturers had produced adaptors that permitted bi-pin lamps being used in older luminaires (equipped with bayonet lamp holders) since the 1960s. The BA20d (sometimes called a Bosch fitting) was once a common automotive (twin filament) headlamp fitting but has largely been superseded by more modern, higher-rated H-series sockets and is only used for some lower-powered applications such as combined automotive tail and stop lamps.

In Japan, the JIS C 8310 “hook ceiling” bayonet mount is quite common. It is designed to both provide power and carry the weight of a lamp. A similar concept existed in BS 7001 as the slide-in “luminaire-supporting coupler” (LSC), but its prominence is unknown.

== Other uses ==
Many cameras with interchangeable lenses use a bayonet lens mount to allow lenses to be changed rapidly and locked accurately in position. Camera lens mounts usually employ stronger flattened tabs rather than pins, though their function is the same.

A bayonet mount is often used to mate a cylinder with a base in cylindrical packaging such as that for CD spindles.

== Antecedents ==
The bayonet mount was used by the Maya Civilization during the Late Classic period of their culture. There is material evidence such as the Río Azul chocolatera, found in the royal tomb #19 of that pre-Hispanic city, which used a very sophisticated screw cap system for the 5th century AD. The vessel was found in 1984.

== See also ==
- Arri bayonet
- Bi-pin lamp base
- BNC connector
- Edison screw
- Joseph Swan
- Storz
