= Torchère =

Lamp with a tall stand made of wood or metal

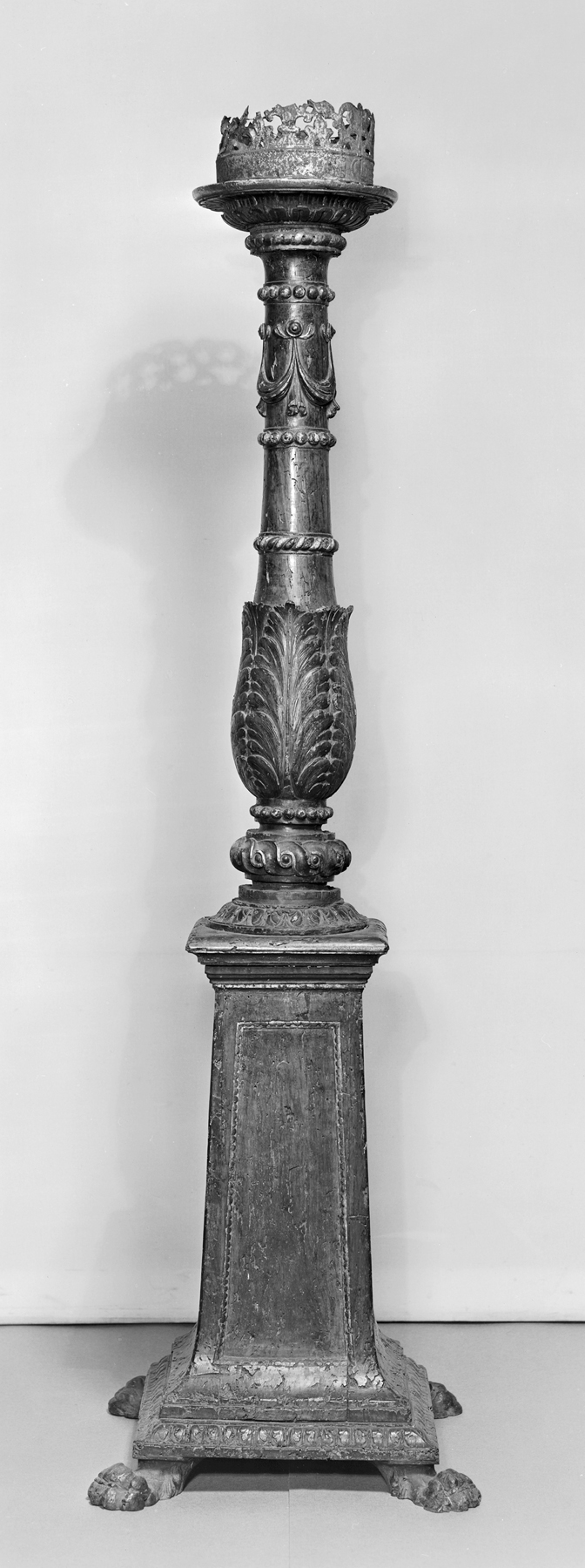
An Italian torchère, decorated with carved Acanthus leaves and clawed feet, in the Walters Art Museum

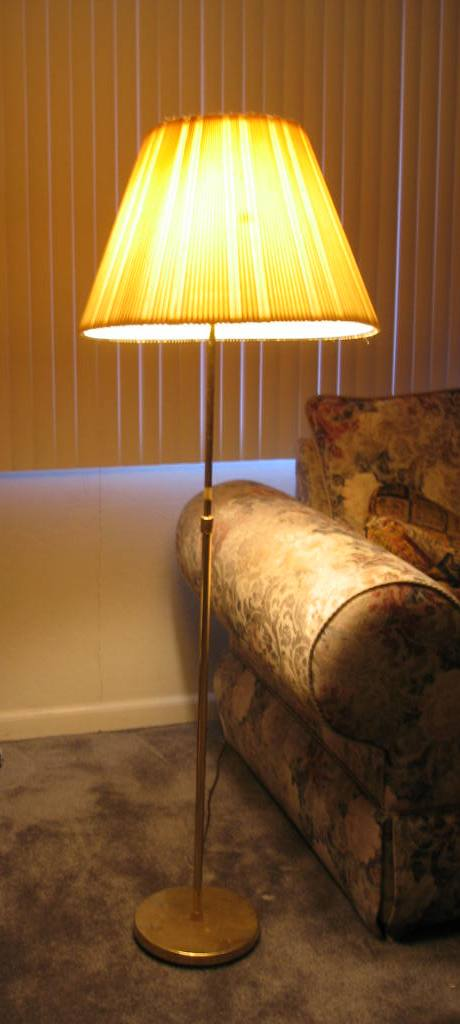
Floor lamp

A torchère (/tɔːrˈʃɛər/ tor-SHAIR; French: torchère [tɔʁ.ʃɛʁ]; also variously spelled "torchèr", "torchière", "torchièr", "torchiere" and "torchier" with various interpretative pronunciations), also known as a standard lamp, torch lamp or floor lamp, is a lamp with a tall stand of wood or metal. Originally, torchères were candelabra, usually with two or three lights. When it was first introduced in France towards the end of the 17th century the torchère mounted one candle only, and when the number was doubled or tripled the improvement was regarded almost as a revolution in the lighting of large rooms.

== Background ==
Today, torchère lamps use fluorescent, halogen, or LED light bulbs. Adjusting the pulse-width modulation in the electronic ballast can allow the fluorescent torchères to be dimmed.

Halogen torchères usually come with a simple switch. Some more expensive models have a TRIAC dimmer circuit built into the stem. Early lamps with 300W bulbs tended to fail quickly. Retrofitting the lamp with a 100W bulb resulted in a substantial improvement in bulb life with minimal loss in brightness.

Halogen torchères have been banned in some places, such as dormitories, because of the large numbers of fires they have caused. The torchère was held responsible by the US Consumer Product Safety Commission for 100 fires and 10 deaths since 1992. Halogen bulbs operate at high temperatures and the tall height of the lamps brings them near flammable materials, such as curtains.

== See also ==
- Mogul lamp
