= Edison screw =

Lightbulb socket standard (E5-E40)

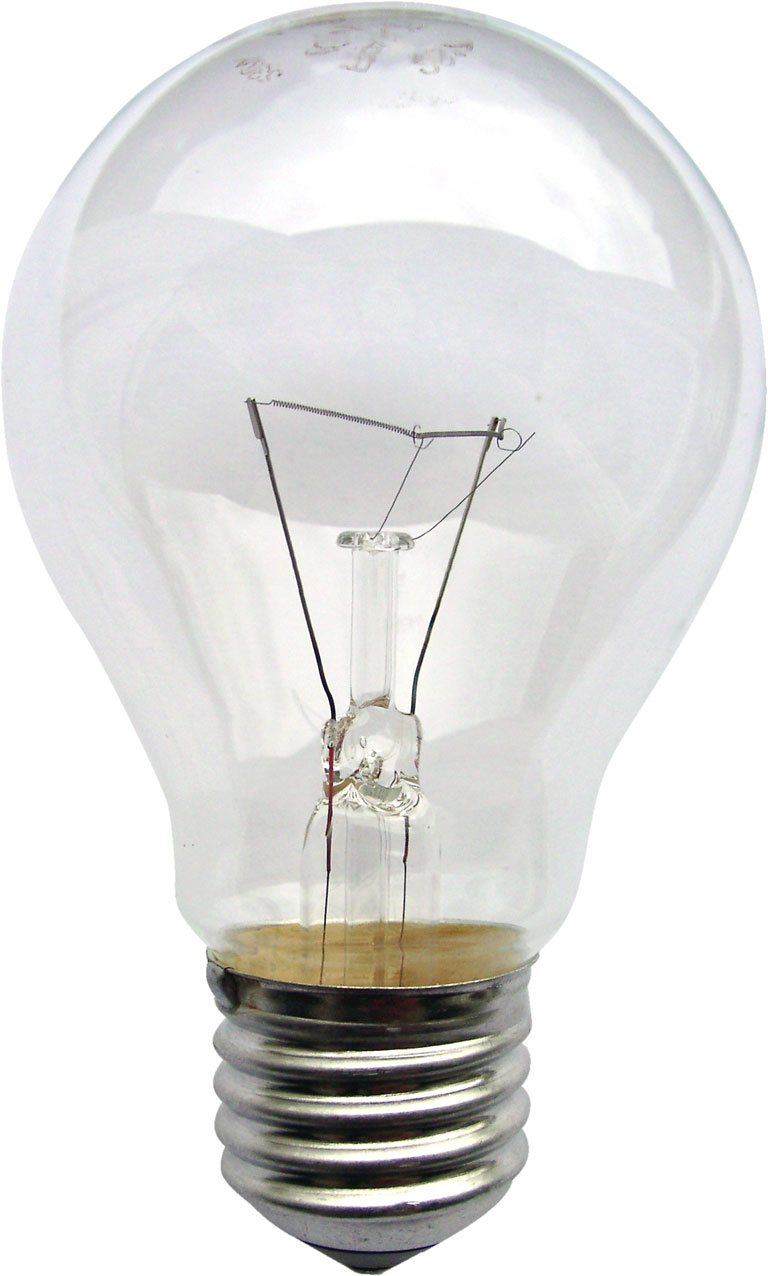
230/240-volt incandescent light bulb with E27 screw base

Edison screw (ES) is a standard lightbulb socket for electric light bulbs. It was developed by Thomas Edison (1847–1931), patented in 1881, and was licensed in 1909 under General Electric's Mazda trademark. The bulbs have right-hand threaded metal bases (caps) which screw into matching threaded sockets (lamp holders). For bulbs powered by AC current, the thread is generally connected to neutral and the contact on the bottom tip of the base is connected to the "live" phase.

In North America and continental Europe, Edison screws displaced other socket types for general lighting. In the early days of electrification, Edison screws were the only standard connector, and appliances other than light bulbs were connected to AC power via lamp sockets. The Edison base was also used as the original base for camera flash bulbs. Today, Edison screw sockets comply with international standards.

Their types are designated as "Exx", such as "E26", where xx indicates the diameter of the socket in millimeters.

== History ==
In the United States, early manufacturers of incandescent lamps used several different and incompatible bases in the 1880s and 1890s. In designing his screw, Edison copied the lid of a kerosene can in his workshop, even sawing it off to make a prototype in 1880. Another company, the Thomson-Houston Electric Company, used a threaded stud at the bottom of the socket and a flat contact ring. The Sawyer-Man, or Westinghouse, base used a spring clip acting on grooves in the bulb base and a contact stud at the bottom of the lamp. Most smaller competitors had to produce lamps for all three types, and some used their own designs as well. Other lamp bases include the bayonet mount and wedge base.

All three major designs were patented. Edison himself filed his applications in 1881 and 1890. In response to Edison's patent, Reginald Fessenden invented the bi-pin connector for the 1893 World's Fair.

After some design tweaks Edison settled upon a screw 1 inch in diameter with 7 threads per inch of length, which much later became E26. Screw shells produced as early as 1888 had a lighter taper than the modern ones.

In 1892, Edison General Electric Company merged with Thomson-Houston to found General Electric, which gradually adopted the Edison screw and made it prevalent. By about 1908, the Edison base was most common in the U.S. with the others falling out of use.

Proposals to introduce one or several international standards for Edison screws began in 1918, when France suggested to the International Electrotechnical Commission (IEC) to take up the issue of sockets and holders. All IEC attempts to reach consensus by 1925 failed, but lamp makers continued the work in an independent committee and developed two standards—one for Europe, another for Americas—which were endorsed by the IEC in 1930 and 1931 respectively. It was in this period when E-designations of screws first originated in Germany (where seven DIN VDE standards were enacted in 1924—1925) and then adopted by IEC.

== Types ==
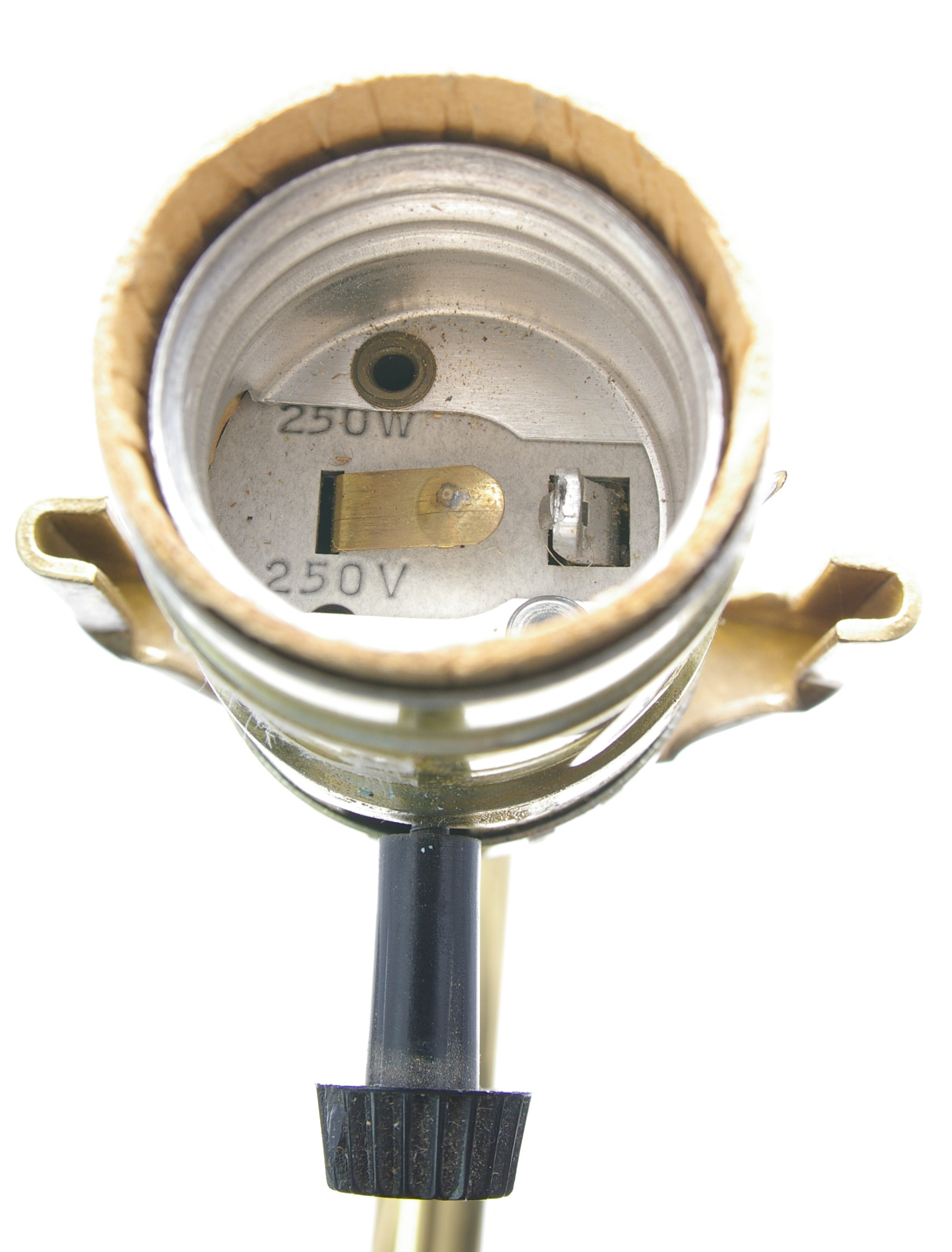
Three-way E26d light socket

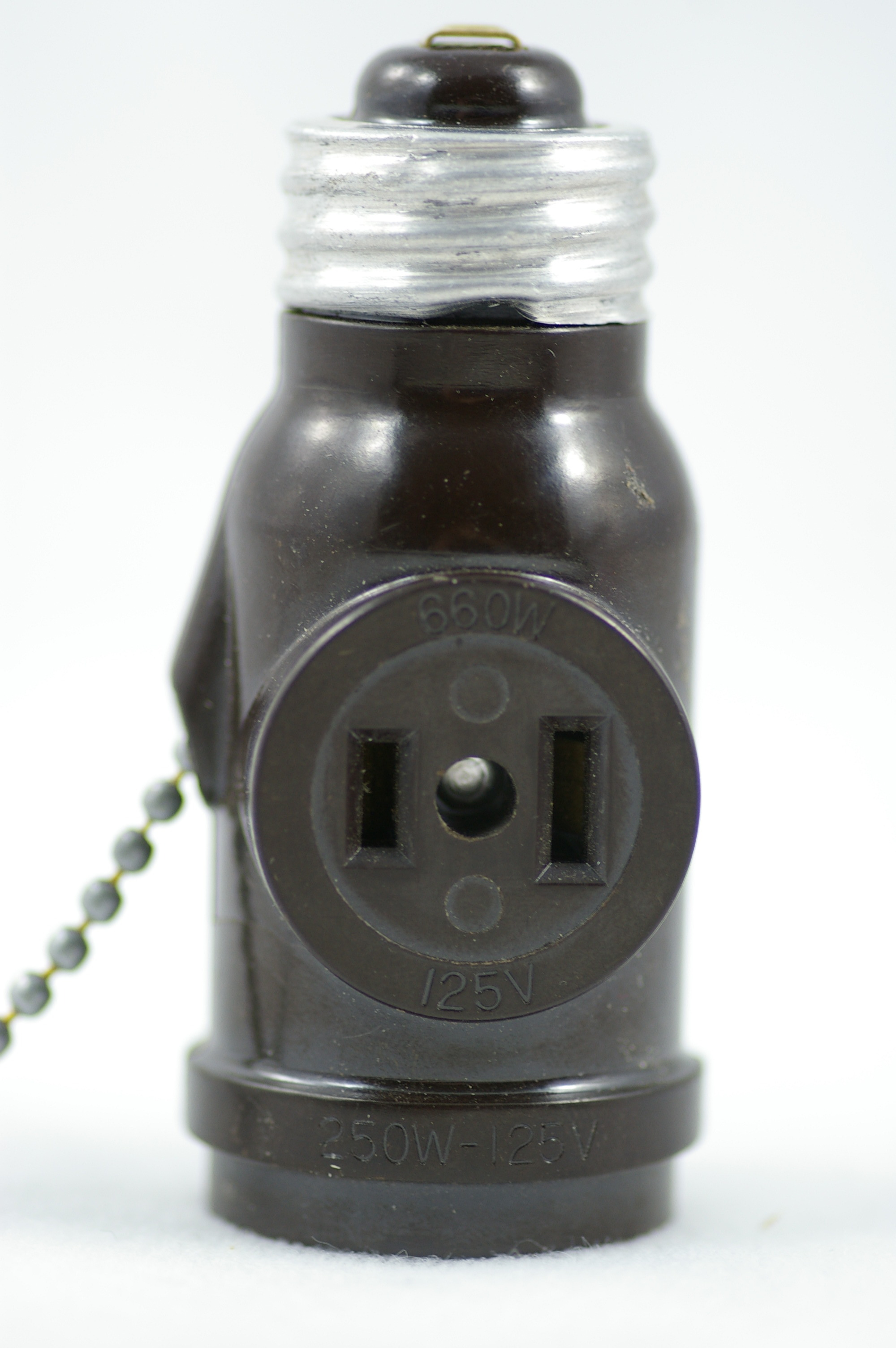
E26 Edison screw to NEMA 1-15 adapter

Specifications for all lamp mount types are defined in the following American National Standards Institute (ANSI) and International Electrotechnical Commission (IEC) publications:

- Lamp Caps – ANSI C81.61 and IEC 60061-1
- Lamp Holders – ANSI C81.62 and IEC 60061-2
- Gauges (to ensure interchangeability) – ANSI C81.63 and IEC 60061-3
- Guidelines for Electrical Lamp Bases, Lampholders and Gauges – ANSI C81.64 and IEC 60061-4

Generally, the two standards are harmonized, although several types of screw mount are still defined in only one standard.

In the designation "Exx", "E" stands for Edison and xx indicates the diameter in millimeters as measured across the peaks of the thread on the base (male), e.g., E12 has a diameter of 12 mm. This is distinct from the glass envelope (bulb) diameter, which in the U.S. is given in eighths of an inch, e.g., A19, MR16, T12. There are four commonly used thread size groups for mains supply lamps:

1. Candelabra: E12 North America, E11 in Europe
2. Intermediate: E17 North America, E14 (Small ES, SES) in Europe
3. Medium or standard: E26 (MES) in North America, E27 (ES) in Europe
4. Mogul: E39 North America, E40 (Goliath ES) in Europe.

The E26 and E27 are usually interchangeable, as are the E39 and E40, although less so; although there is only a 1 mm difference in thread outside diameter, there is a small difference in pitch; an E40 cap will often fit in an E39 holder but not the other way around. E11 and E12 are not interchangeable. Other semi-standard screw thread sizes are available for certain specific applications.

The large E39 "Mogul" and E40 "Goliath" base are used on street lights, and high-power lamps (such as a 100 W / 200 W / 300 W three-way) and many high-intensity discharge lamps. In areas following the U.S. National Electrical Code, general-use lamps over 300 W cannot use an E26 base and must instead use the E39 base. Medium Edison screw (MES) bulbs for 12 V are also produced for recreational vehicles. Large outdoor Christmas lights use Intermediate base, as do some desk lamps and many microwave ovens. Previously, emergency exit signs also tended to use the intermediate base, but U.S. and Canadian rules now require long-life and energy-efficient LED lamps, which can be purchased inside a conventional Edison base bulb as a retrofit. A medium screw base should not carry more than 25 amperes current; this may limit the practical rating of low voltage lamps.

E29 "Admedium" bases are used for special applications; for example, UV spotlight lamps in magnetic crack detection machines.

In countries that use 220–240 volt AC domestic power, standard-size E27 and small E14 are the most common screw-mount sizes and are prevalent throughout continental Europe (Note: The BC or bayonet mount fitting is the most common light bulb fitting in the UK and many British Commonwealth countries, and is found in older installations in some other countries, including France and Greece.) and China.

In 120 volt North America, 100 volt Japan and 110 volt Taiwan, the standard size for general-purpose lamps is E26.

E12 is typically used for candelabra fixtures. E14 or E17 are also sometimes used, especially in small table lamps and novelty lighting, and occasionally the lights on newer ceiling fans. Christmas lights may use several base sizes: E17 for C9 bulbs, E12 for C7 bulbs, E10 for decades-old series-wired C6 bulb sets in the U.S., and an entirely different wedge base for T1¾ mini-lights. For a short time early on, these mini lights were manufactured using E5 screw bases.

A tiny E5 or E5.5 size is only used for extra-low voltages, such as in interior illumination for model buildings, and model vehicles such as model trains. These are often called "pea bulbs" if they are globe-shaped, but they commonly look like sub-miniature Christmas bulbs, or large "grain-of-wheat" bulbs. E10 bulbs are common on battery-powered flashlights, as are bayonet mounts (although those are usually held in with a circular flange located where the base meets the glass envelope of the bulb). The E11 base is sometimes used for 50/75/100 watt halogen lamps in North America, where it is called the "mini-can", and tighter threads are used to keep them out of E12 base nightlights and other places where they could start a fire.

There are also adapters between screw sizes, and for adapting to or from bayonet caps. A socket extender makes the bulb stick out further, such as to accommodate a compact fluorescent lamp that is too large to fit in a recessed lighting fixture.

Most Edison screws have right-hand threads (bulb is turned clockwise to tighten), but left-hand threaded screws are sometimes used, usually for a non-standard-voltage or -power bulb. This prevents the use of an incorrect bulb, which could cause damage. Public locations such as railway trains and the New York City Subway have used light bulbs with left-hand threads to discourage theft of the bulbs for use in regular light fixtures.

== Fittings ==
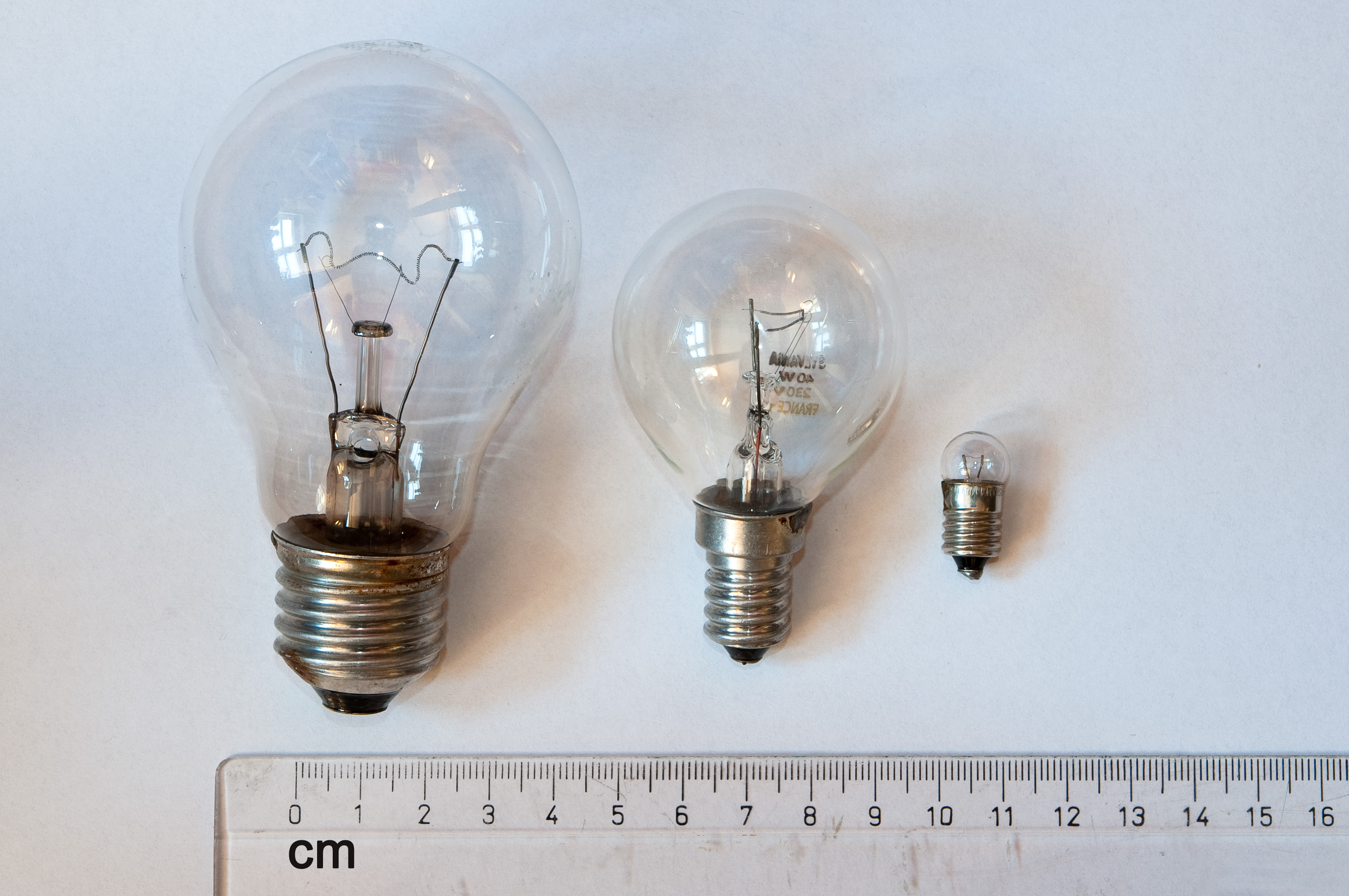
From left to right: E27, E14, and E10 bulbs

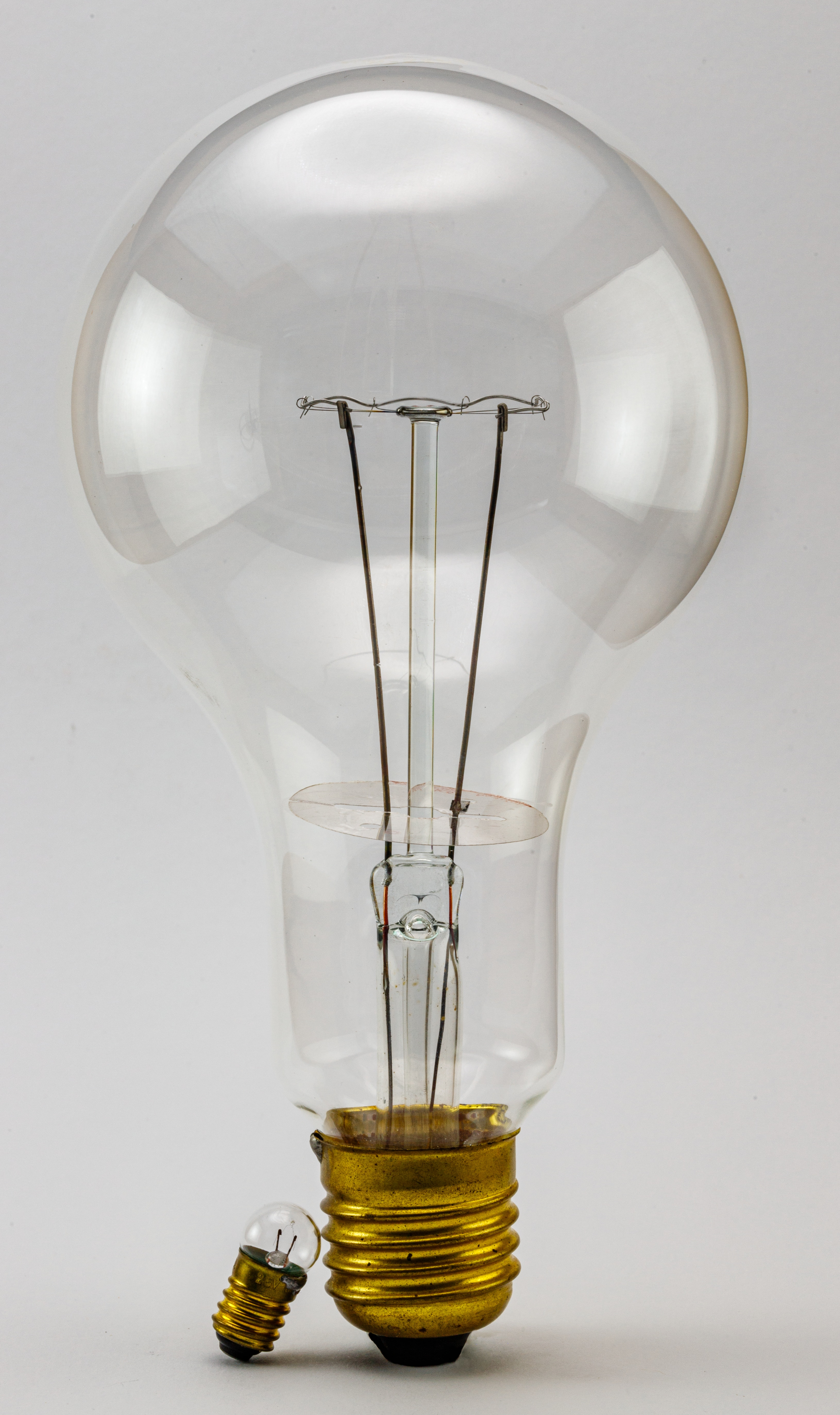
E27 (230 V / 200 W) and E10 (2.5 V / 0.5 W)

Designation	Base major diameter (thread external)	Pitch mm	Name	Applications	IEC 60061-1 standard sheet
E5 (E5.5)	5.5 mm (0.217 in)	1	Lilliput Edison Screw (LES)	Indicator lights, decorative lights	7004-25-3
E10	10 mm (0.394 in)	1.81	Miniature Edison Screw (MES), C6	Flashlights, bicycle lights	7004-22
E11	11 mm (0.433 in)	—	Mini-Candelabra Edison Screw (mini-can)	120 V halogen mini-candelabra	7004-6-1
E12	12 mm (0.472 in)	2.6	Candelabra Edison Screw (CES), C7	120 V candelabra/night lamp	7004-28
E14	14 mm (0.551 in)	2.82	Small Edison Screw (SES)	230 V candelabra/chandelier, night lamps, some pendant lights	7004-23
E16	16 mm (0.630 in)	2.5			
E17	17 mm (0.669 in)	—	Intermediate Edison Screw (IES), C9	120 V appliance, decorative lights	7004-26
E18	18 mm (0.709 in)	3.0			
E26	26 mm (1.024 in)	—	Medium Edison Screw (ES)	Standard 120 V lamps	7004-21A-2
E27	27 mm (1.063 in)	3.62	Edison Screw (ES)	Standard 230 V lamps	7004-21
E33	33 mm (1.299 in)	4.23			
E39	39 mm (1.535 in)	—	Mogul Edison Screw	120 V 250+ W industrial	7004-24A-1
E40	40 mm (1.575 in)	6.35	Goliath Edison Screw (GES)	230 V 250+ W industrial	7004-24

Three-way lamps have a d suffix to indicate double contacts, usually E26d or E27d, or rarely E39d. The second contact is used for the lower-power filament of the two inside the lamp. On the lamp base the extra contact is a ring around the main (central) contact. Unlike bayonet sockets, three-way and regular lamps are interchangeable, although the low filament or low setting does not work if mismatched.

The small Edison screw has nine threads per inch, or a pitch of 1/9 in or 2.8222 mm per thread.

The medium Edison screw has seven threads per inch, or a pitch of 1/7 in or 3.6286 mm per thread. In the U.S., the Energy Independence and Security Act of 2007 requirement for greater energy efficiency only applies to the medium Edison screw, all other being considered "specialty" lamps.

Diazed fuses DII uses the same E27 thread as standard 230 V lamps but have a longer body and cannot be screwed into a lamp holder (socket). A lamp base is too short to contact the bottom terminal of a fuse holder. However it is possible (but not useful) to screw a DII fuse holder without a fuse in an E27 lamp holder.

== Other uses ==
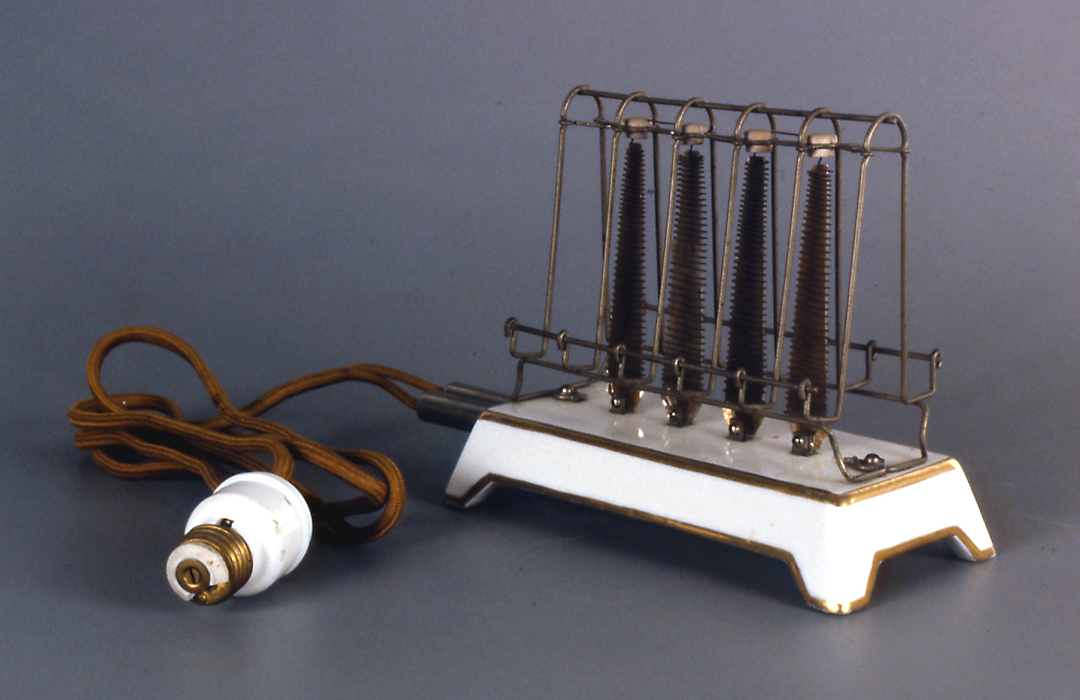
A 1909 toaster with Edison plug

The Edison screw socket was used as an outlet (such as for toasters) when mains electricity was still mainly used for lighting, and before wall outlets became common.

In North America, fuses were used in buildings wired before 1960. These Edison base fuses would screw into a fuse socket similar to Edison-base incandescent lamps.

Some adapters for wall outlets use an Edison screw, allowing a light socket to become an ungrounded electrical outlet (such as to install Christmas lights temporarily via a porch light), or to make a pull-chain switch with two outlets, or to split it for two lamps. Another adapter can make a wall outlet into a lamp holder (lamp socket).

Various other accessories have been made, including a smoke detector that recharges over a few hours and lasts for a few days or weeks thereafter, and still allows the attached lamp to operate normally. There have also been electronics that stick onto the end of the screw base and allow the attached lamp to flash, for example, to attract the attention of arriving guests or emergency vehicles; others function as a dimmer or timer, or dim gradually in a child's bedroom in the evening.

Some vacuum tubes, such as certain rectifiers, use an Edison screw base.

== See also ==
- A-series light bulb
- Bayonet mount
- GU24 lamp fitting
- Multifaceted reflector
- Screw thread diameters
