= Compact fluorescent lamp =

Fluorescent lamps with folded tubes, often with built-in ballast

Compact fluorescent lamp (CFL) examples

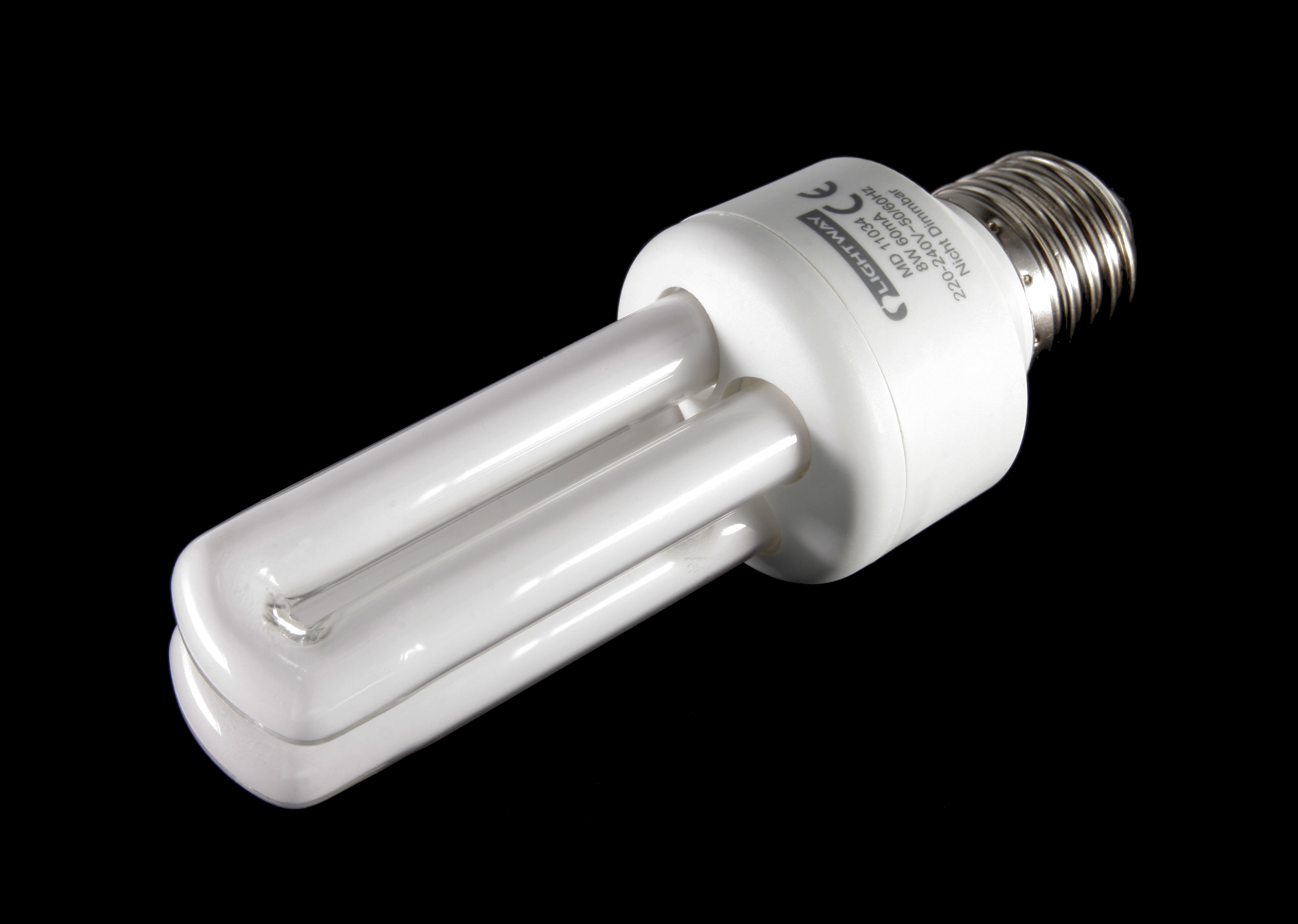
The tubular-form CFL is one of the most popular types in Europe.

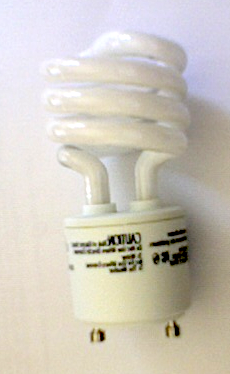
CFL with GU24 lamp fitting

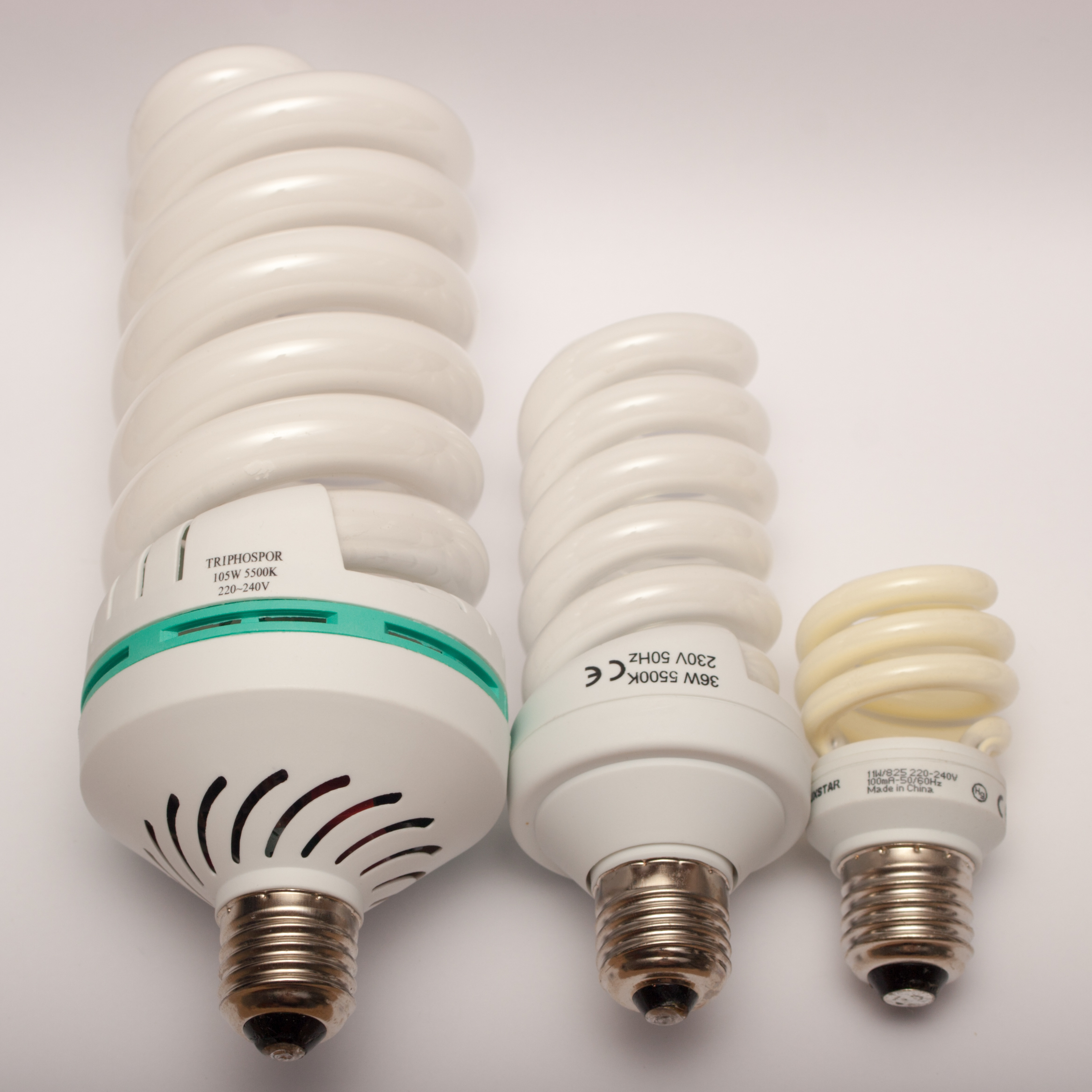
CFLs of varying power: 105W, 36W and 11W

A compact fluorescent lamp (CFL), also called compact fluorescent light, energy-saving light and compact fluorescent tube, is a fluorescent lamp designed to replace an incandescent light bulb; some types fit into light fixtures designed for incandescent bulbs. The lamps use a tube that is curved or folded to fit into the space of an incandescent bulb, and a compact electronic ballast in the base of the lamp.

Compared to general-service incandescent lamps giving the same amount of visible light, CFLs use one-fourth to one-third the electric power, and last eight to fifteen times longer. A CFL has a higher purchase price than an incandescent lamp, but can save over five times its purchase price in electricity costs over the lamp's lifetime. Like all fluorescent lamps, CFLs contain toxic mercury, which complicates their disposal. In many countries, governments have banned the disposal of CFLs together with regular garbage. These countries have established special collection systems for CFLs and other hazardous waste.

The principle of operation remains the same as in other fluorescent lighting: electrons that are bound to mercury atoms are excited to states where they will radiate ultraviolet light as they return to a lower energy level; this emitted ultraviolet light is converted into visible light as it strikes the fluorescent coating.

CFLs radiate a spectral power distribution that is different from that of incandescent lamps. Improved phosphor formulations have improved the perceived color of the light emitted by CFLs, so that some sources rate the best "soft white" CFLs as subjectively similar in color to standard incandescent lamps.

White LED lamps compete with CFLs for high-efficiency lighting. General Electric has since stopped production of domestic CFL lamps in the United States in favour of LEDs.

== History ==
=== Early fluorescent lights ===
The parent to the modern fluorescent lamp was invented in the 1890s by Peter Cooper Hewitt. The Cooper Hewitt lamps were used for photographic studios and industries.

Edmund Germer, Friedrich Meyer, and Hans Spanner patented a high-pressure vapor lamp in 1927. George Inman later teamed with General Electric to create a practical fluorescent lamp, sold in 1938 and patented in 1941. Circular and U-shaped lamps were devised to reduce the length of fluorescent light fixtures. The first fluorescent light bulb and fixture were displayed to the general public at the 1939 New York World's Fair.

=== Development of compact fluorescent lamp ===
The spiral CFL was invented in 1976 by Edward E. Hammer, an engineer with General Electric, in response to the 1973 oil crisis. Although the design met its goals, it would have cost GE about $25 million to build new factories to produce the lamps, and thus the invention was shelved. The design was eventually copied by others.

In 1980, Philips introduced its model SL*18, which was a screw-in or bayonet mount lamp with integral magnetic ballast. The lamp used a folded T4 tube, stable tri-color phosphors, and a mercury amalgam. This was the first successful screw-in replacement for an incandescent lamp, using new rare earth aluminum lattice phosphors to solve the problem of lumen depreciation that would normally occur quickly in such a thin tube; however, it was not widely adopted, because of its large size, weight (over half a kilogram), pronounced 50 Hz flicker and 3-minute warm up time. It was based on the SL1000 prototype from 1976. In 1985, Osram started selling its model Dulux EL, which was the first CFL to include an electronic ballast.

Volume was an issue in CFL development, since the fluorescent lamps had to fit in the same volume as comparable incandescent lamps. This required the development of new, high-efficacy phosphors that could withstand more power per unit area than the phosphors used in older, larger fluorescent tubes.

=== Mainstream success ===
In 1995, helical CFLs, manufactured in China by Shanghai Xiangshan, became commercially available. They were first proposed by General Electric, which saw difficulties bending glass tubes into spirals using automated machinery. Xiangshan solved this problem by bending the tubes by hand, made possible by the then-low labor costs in China. Since that time, sales steadily increased. The phosphor coating in spiral CFLs is uneven, being thicker at the bottom than at the top, owing to the effect of gravity during the coating process. Although their popularity varied across countries, in China CFLs were the "dominant technology in the residential segment" in 2011.

=== Competition from LED lighting and commercial decline ===
Philips Lighting ceased research on compact fluorescent lamps in 2008 and began devoting the bulk of its research and development budget to solid-state lighting such as LED lighting.

The rise of LED lighting significantly affected CFL sales and production. A basic LED bulb cost less than $5 in 2015, in the United States, and a 2017 proposed regulation attempted to increase the difficulty for CFLs to receive an Energy Star rating. General Electric started phasing out CFL production in early 2016, and in India, nearly 60 per cent of the lighting market were LEDs by 2018.

On September 1, 2021, the EU banned the export, import, manufacture and sale of all compact fluorescent lamps with integrated ballasts.

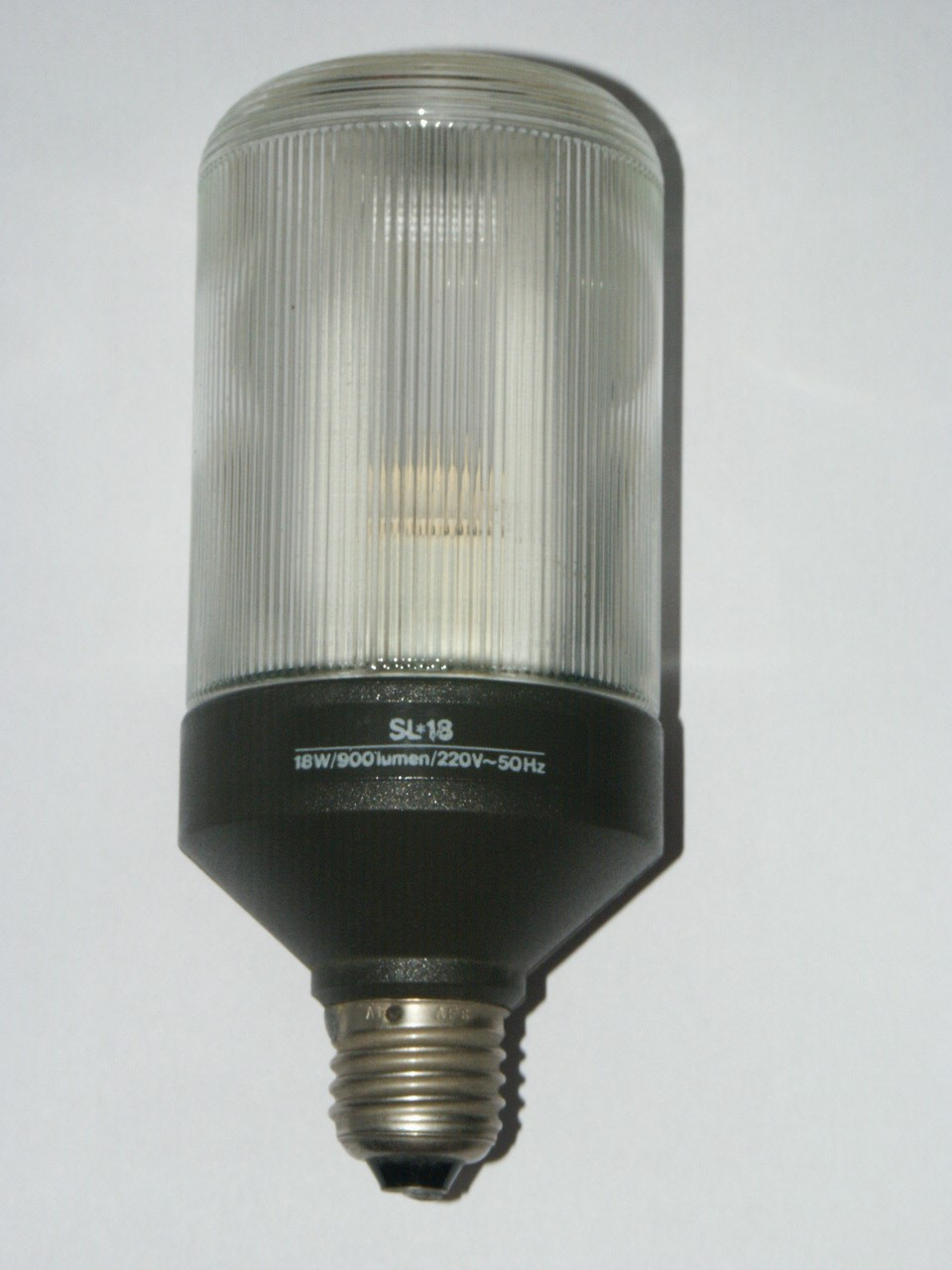
Philips SL*18, an early CFL

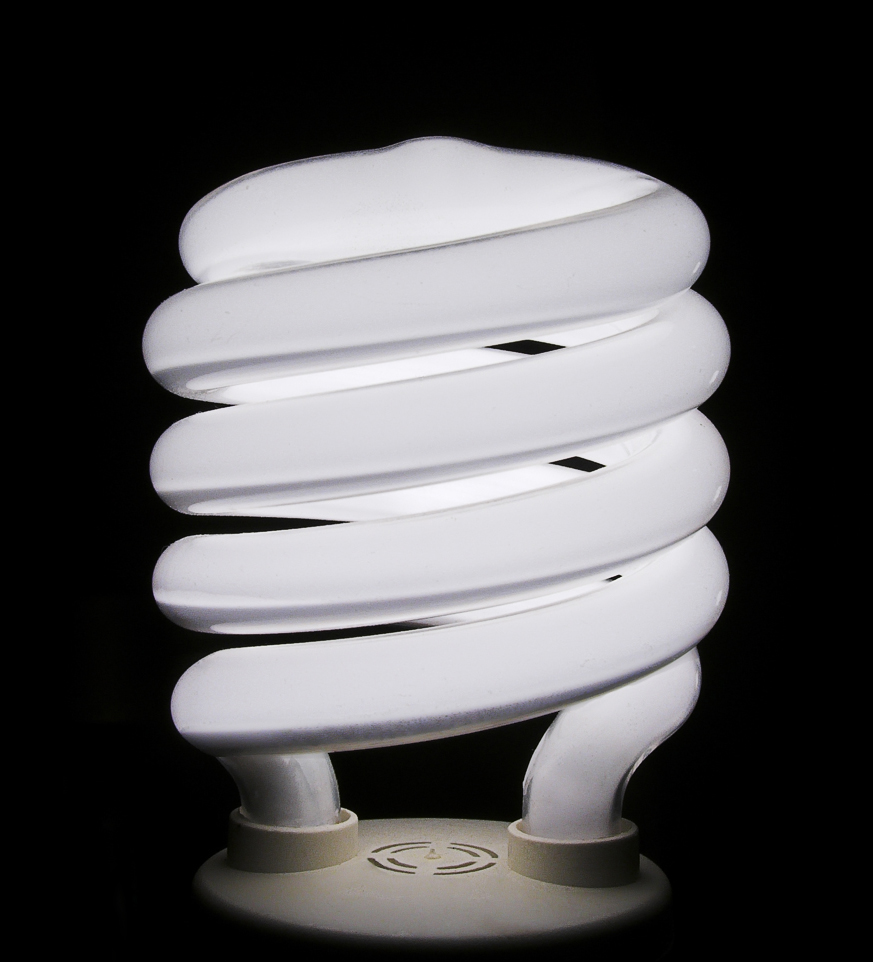
A helical integrated CFL, one of the most popular designs in North America since 1995, when a Chinese firm marketed the first successful design

== Pattern ==
There are two types of CFLs — integrated and non-integrated lamps, where CFL-i denotes an integrated ballast and CFL-ni denotes a non-integrated ballast. Integrated lamps combine the tube and ballast in a single unit. These lamps allow consumers to replace incandescent lamps easily with CFLs. Integrated CFLs work well in many standard incandescent light fixtures, reducing the cost of converting to fluorescent. 3-way lamps and dimmable models with standard bases are available.

Non-integrated CFLs have the ballast permanently installed in the luminaire, and usually only the fluorescent tube is changed at its end of life. Since the ballasts are placed in the light fixture, they are larger and last longer than the integrated ones, and they do not need to be replaced when the tube reaches its end-of-life. Non-integrated CFL housings can be both more expensive and sophisticated. They have two types of tubes: a bi-pin tube designed for conventional ballast, e.g. with G23 or G24d plug-in base, and a quad-pin tube designed for an electronic ballast or a conventional ballast with an external starter. A bi-pin tube contains an integrated starter, which obviates the need for external heating pins but causes incompatibility with electronic ballasts. Non-integrated CFLs can also be installed in a conventional light fixture using an adapter containing a built-in magnetic ballast. The adapter consists of a regular bulb screw, the ballast itself and a clip for the lamp's connector.

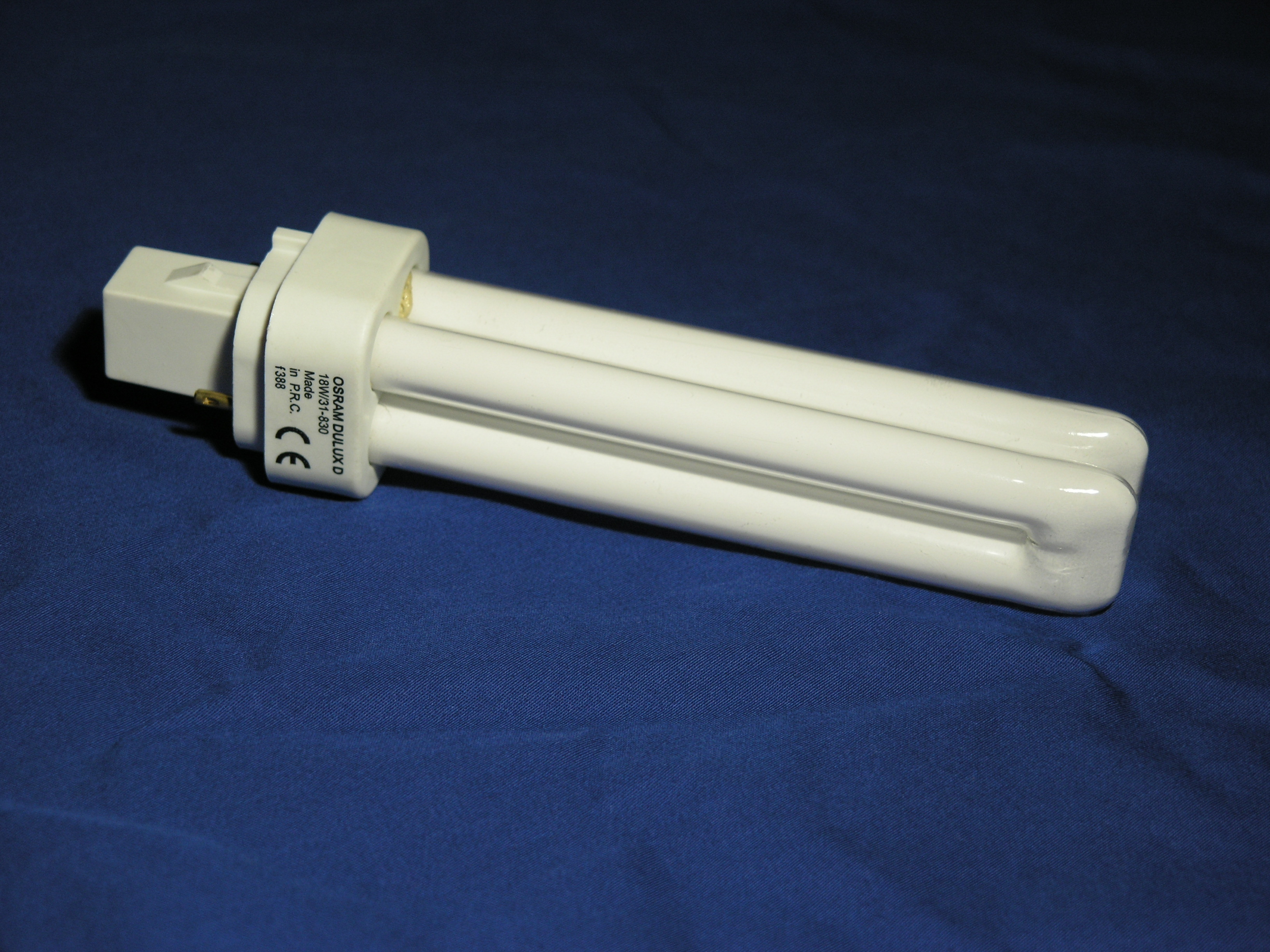
Non-integrated bi-pin double-turn CFL with G24d plug-in base

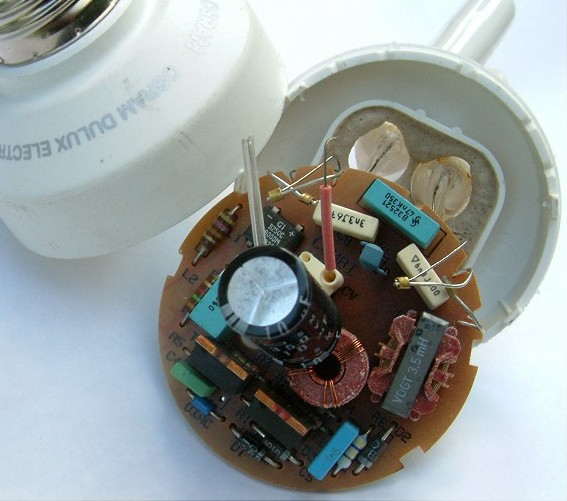
An electronic ballast and permanently attached tube in an integrated CFL

CFLs have two main components: a magnetic or electronic ballast and a gas-filled tube (also called bulb or burner). Replacement of magnetic ballasts with electronic ballasts has removed most of the flickering and slow starting traditionally associated with fluorescent lighting, and has allowed the development of smaller lamps directly interchangeable with more sizes of incandescent light bulb.

Electronic ballasts contain a small circuit board with a bridge rectifier, a filter capacitor and usually two switching transistors, which are often insulated-gate bipolar transistors. The incoming AC current is first rectified to DC, then converted to high frequency AC by the transistors, connected as a resonant series DC to AC inverter. The resulting high frequency is applied to the lamp tube. Since the resonant converter tends to stabilize lamp current (and light emitted) over a range of input voltages, standard CFLs respond poorly in dimming applications and will experience a shorter lifespan and sometimes catastrophic failure. Special electronic ballasts (integrated or separate) are required for dimming service.

CFL light output is roughly proportional to phosphor surface area, and high output CFLs are often larger than their incandescent equivalents. This means that the CFL may not fit well in existing light fixtures. To fit enough phosphor coated area within the approximate overall dimensions of an incandescent lamp, standard shapes of CFL tube are a helix with one or more turns, multiple parallel tubes, circular arc, or a butterfly.

Some CFLs are labeled not to be run base up, since heat will shorten the ballast's life. Such CFLs are unsuitable for use in pendant lights and especially unsuitable for recessed light fixtures. CFLs designed for use in such fixtures are available. Current recommendations for fully enclosed, unventilated light fixtures (such as those recessed into insulated ceilings), are either to use "reflector CFLs" (R-CFL), cold-cathode CFLs or to replace such fixtures with those designed for CFLs. A CFL will thrive in areas that have good airflow, such as in a table lamp.

== Characteristics ==
=== Spectrum of light ===
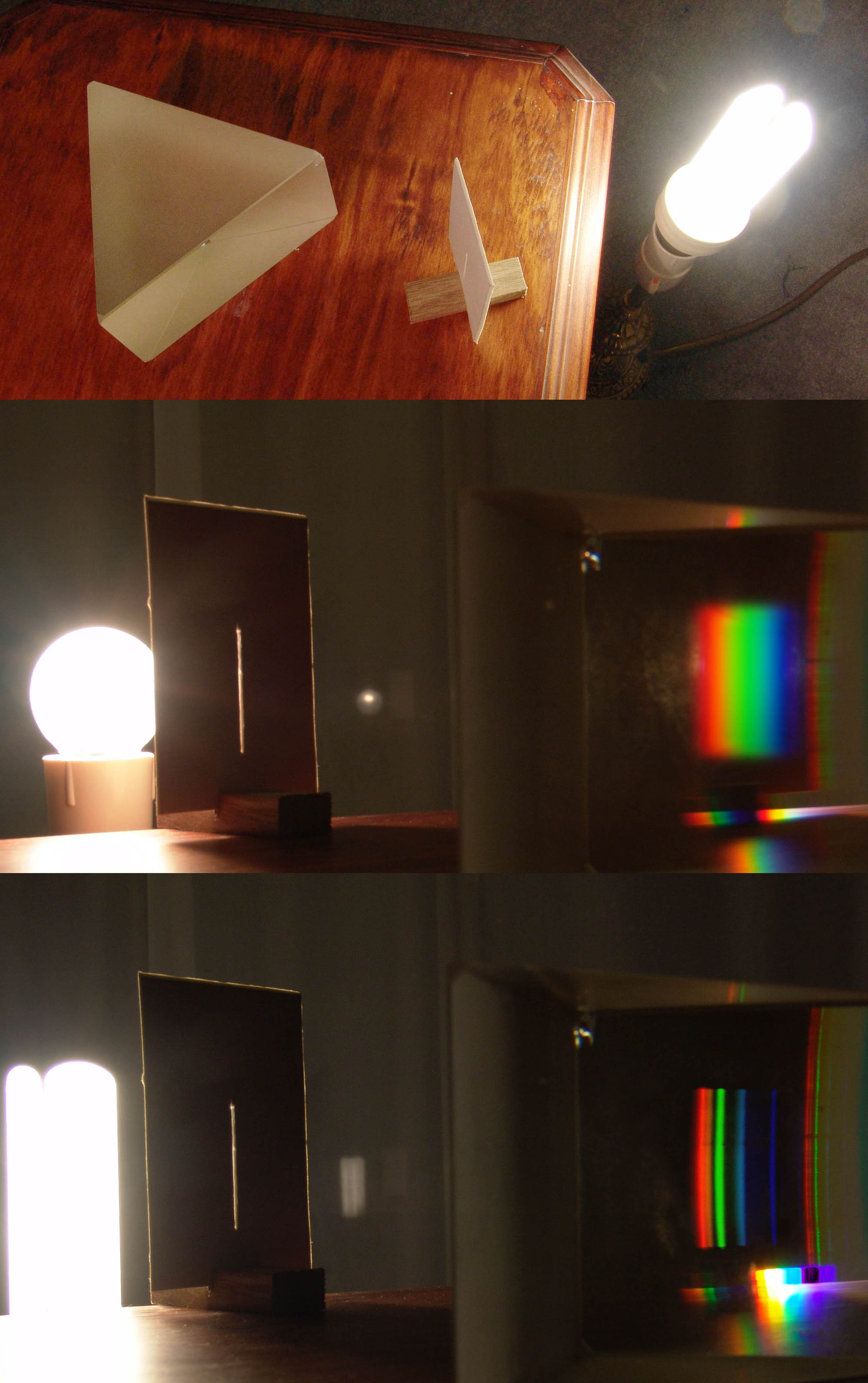
Emitted visible light spectrum of an incandescent lamp (mid) and a CFL (bottom)

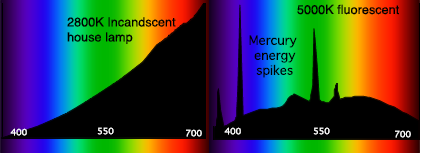
Characteristic spectral power distributions (SPDs) for an incandescent lamp (left) and a CFL (right). The horizontal axes are in nanometers and the vertical axes show relative intensity in arbitrary units. Significant peaks of UV light are present for CFL even if not visible.

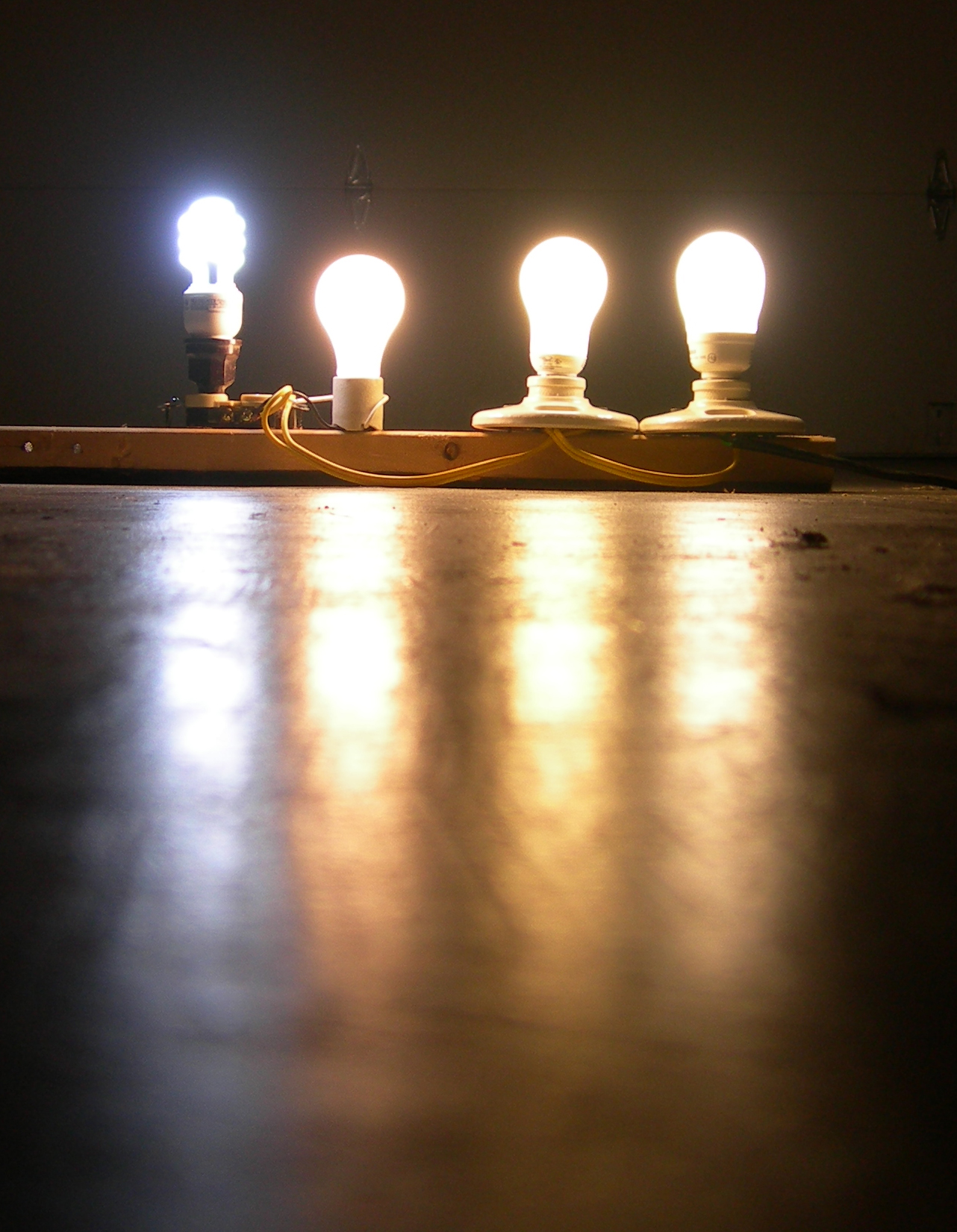
A photograph of various lamps illustrates the effect of color temperature differences. From left to right: • Compact Fluorescent (General Electric, 13 W, 6500 K) • Incandescent (Sylvania, 60 W, Extra Soft White) • Compact Fluorescent (Bright Effects, 15 W, 2644 K • Compact Fluorescent (Sylvania, 14 W, 3000 K)

CFLs emit light from a mix of phosphors, each emitting one band of color with some bands still in the ultraviolet range as can be seen on the light spectrum. Modern phosphor designs balance the emitted light color, energy efficiency, and cost. Every extra phosphor added to the coating mix improves color rendering but decreases efficiency and increases cost. Good quality consumer CFLs use three or four phosphors to achieve a "white" light with a color rendering index (CRI) of about 80, where the maximum 100 represents the appearance of colors under daylight or other sources of black-body radiation such as an incandescent light bulb (depending on the correlated color temperature).

Color temperature can be indicated in kelvins or mireds (1 million divided by the color temperature in kelvins). The color temperature of a light source is the temperature of a black body that has the same chromaticity (i.e. color) as the light source. A notional temperature, the correlated color temperature, the temperature of a black body that emits light of a hue that to human color perception most closely matches the light from the lamp, is assigned.

The color temperature is characteristic of black-body radiation; practical white light sources approximate the radiation of a black body at a given temperature, but will not have an identical spectrum. In particular, narrow bands of shorter-wavelength radiation are usually present even for lamps of low color temperature ("warm" light).

As color temperature increases, the shading of the white light changes from red to yellow to white to blue. Color names used for modern CFLs and other tri-phosphor lamps vary between manufacturers, unlike the standardized names used with older halophosphate fluorescent lamps. For example, Sylvania's Daylight CFLs have a color temperature of 3500 K, while most other lamps called daylight have color temperatures of at least 5000 K. In United States, Energy Star's specification provides a set of named color temperatures for certified luminaries.

Energy Star color temperatures
Name	Color temperature	
Name	(K)	(Mired)
Soft white	2700	370
Warm white	3000	333
Neutral White	3500	286
Cool white	4000—4100	250—243
Daylight	5000—6500	200—154

=== Lifespan ===
CFLs typically have a rated service life of 6000–15,000 hours, whereas standard incandescent lamps have a service life of 750 or 1000 hours. However, the actual lifetime of any lamp depends on many factors, including operating voltage, manufacturing defects, exposure to voltage spikes, mechanical shock, frequency of cycling on and off, lamp orientation, and ambient operating temperature, among other factors.

The life of a CFL is significantly shorter if it is turned on and off frequently or is used in a totally enclosed fixture. This happens because the electrodes in a CFL undergo sputtering every time it is turned on; this also happens in fluorescent tubes. Material from the electrodes is ejected every time sputtering occurs and it is deposited on the fluorescent tube's walls, showing as lamp end darkening. In the case of a 5-minute on/off cycle the lifespan of some CFLs may be reduced to that of incandescent light bulbs. The US Energy Star program suggests that fluorescent lamps be left on when leaving a room for less than 15 minutes to mitigate this problem. CFLs emit less light later in their lives than when they are new. The light output decay is exponential, with the fastest losses being soon after the lamp is first used. By the end of their lives, CFLs can be expected to emit 70–80% of their original light output. The response of the human eye to light is logarithmic. That is, while the human eye is highly sensitive to changes in the intensity of faint light sources, it is less sensitive to changes in the intensity of brighter light sources since the pupils compensate by dilating or constricting. So, presuming the illumination provided by the lamp was ample at the beginning of its life, and the light output of a bulb gradually decreases by 25%, viewers will perceive a much smaller change in light intensity.

Fluorescent lamps get dimmer over their lifetime, so what starts out as an adequate luminosity may become inadequate. In one test by the U.S. Department of Energy, of Energy Star products in 2003–04, one quarter of tested CFLs no longer met their rated output after 40% of their rated service life. Some CFLs may lose mercury at the end of their lifespan, which can cause the lamp to lose output and eventually cause it to shift to a dim pink hue.

=== Energy efficiency ===
Energy use for different types of light bulbs operating at different light outputs. Points lower on the graph correspond to lower energy use.

Because the eye's sensitivity changes with the wavelength, the output of lamps is commonly measured in lumens, a measure of the power of light as perceived by the human eye. The luminous efficacy of lamps is the number of lumens emitted for each watt of electric power used. The luminous efficacy of a typical CFL is 50–70 lumens per watt (lm/W) and that of a typical incandescent lamp is 10–17 lm/W. Compared to a theoretical 100%-efficient lamp (680 lm/W), CFL lamps have lighting efficiency ranges of 7–10%, versus 1.5–2.5% for incandescents.

Because of their higher efficacy, CFLs use between one-seventh and one-third of the power of equivalent incandescent lamps. Of 2010 world total lighting sales, 50 to 70 percent were incandescent. Replacing all inefficient lighting with CFLs would save 409 terawatt-hours (1.47 exajoules) per year, 2.5% of world electricity use. In the US, it is estimated that replacing all incandescents would save 80 TWh yearly. Since CFLs use much less energy than incandescent lamps (ILs), a phase-out of ILs would result in less carbon dioxide (CO_{2}) being emitted into the atmosphere. Exchanging ILs for efficient CFLs on a global scale would achieve annual CO_{2} reductions of 230 Mt (million tons), more than the combined yearly CO_{2} emissions of the Netherlands and Portugal.

Electric power equivalents for differing lamps
Minimum light output (lumens)	Electric power use (watts)		
Minimum light output (lumens)	Incandescent	Compact fluorescent	LED
450	40	9–11	6–8
800	60	13–15	9–12
1100	75	18–20	13–16
1600	100	23–28	15–22
2400	150	30–52	24–28
3100	200	49–75	30
4000	300	75–100	38

If a building's indoor incandescent lamps are replaced by CFLs, the heat emitted due to lighting is significantly reduced. In warm climates, or in office or industrial buildings where air conditioning is often required, CFLs reduce the load on the cooling system when compared to the use of incandescent lamps, resulting in savings in electricity in addition to the energy efficiency savings of the lamps. However, in cooler climates in which buildings require heating, the heating system must replace the reduced heat from lighting fixtures. In Winnipeg, Canada, it was estimated that CFLs would only generate 17% savings in energy compared to incandescent bulbs, as opposed to the 75% savings that could have been expected without space heating considerations.

=== Cost ===
While the purchase price of a CFL is typically 3–10 times greater than that of an equivalent incandescent lamp, a CFL lasts 8–15 times longer and uses two-thirds to three-quarters less energy. A US article stated "A household that invested $90 in changing 30 fixtures to CFLs would save $440 to $1,500 over the five-year life of the bulbs, depending on your cost of electricity. Look at your utility bill and imagine a 12% discount to estimate the savings."

CFLs are extremely cost-effective in commercial buildings when used to replace incandescent lamps. Using average U.S. commercial electricity and gas rates for 2006, a 2008 article found that replacing each 75 W incandescent lamp with a CFL resulted in yearly savings of $22 in energy usage, reduced HVAC cost, and reduced labour to change lamps. The incremental capital investment of $2 per fixture is typically paid back in about one month. Savings are greater and payback periods shorter in regions with higher electric rates and, to a lesser extent, also in regions with higher than U.S. average cooling requirements. However, frequent on-off cycling (turning on and off) of CFLs greatly reduces their lifespan.

The current price of CFLs reflects the manufacturing of nearly all CFLs in China, where labour costs less. In September 2010, the Winchester, Virginia, General Electric plant closed, leaving Osram Sylvania and the tiny American Light Bulb Manufacturing Inc. the last companies to make standard incandescent bulbs in the United States. At that time, Ellis Yan, whose Chinese company made the majority of CFLs sold in the United States, said he was interested in building a United States factory to make CFL bulbs, but wanted $12.5 million from the U.S. government to do so. General Electric had considered changing one of its bulb plants to make CFLs, but said that even after a $40 million investment in converting a plant, wage differences would mean costs would be 50% higher.

According to an August 2009 newspaper report, some manufacturers claimed that CFLs could be used to replace higher-power incandescent lamps than justified by their light output. Equivalent wattage claims can be replaced by comparison of actual light output emitted by the lamp, which is measured in lumens and marked on the packaging.

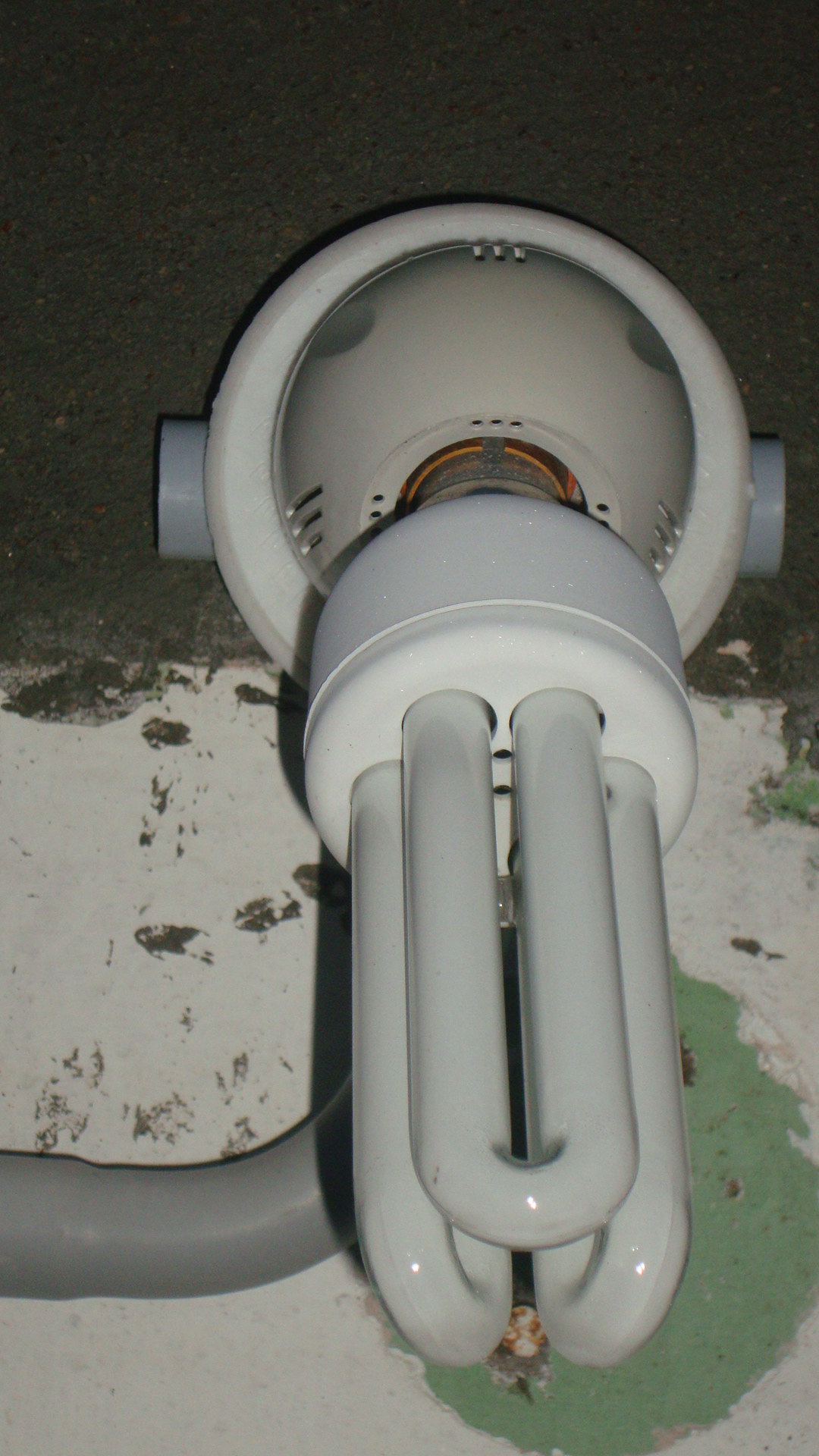
Compact fluorescent lamp with wall-mounted holder

=== Failure ===
In addition to the wear-out failure modes common to all fluorescent lamps, the electronic ballast may fail, since it has a number of component parts. Ballast failures are usually due to overheating and may be accompanied by discoloration or distortion of the ballast enclosure, odors, or smoke. The lamps are internally protected and are meant to fail safely at the end of their lives. By 2012, industry associations were working toward advising consumers of the different failure modes of CFLs compared to incandescent lamps, and to develop lamps with inoffensive failure modes. New North American technical standards aimed to eliminate smoke or excess heat at the end of lamp life.

=== Dimming ===
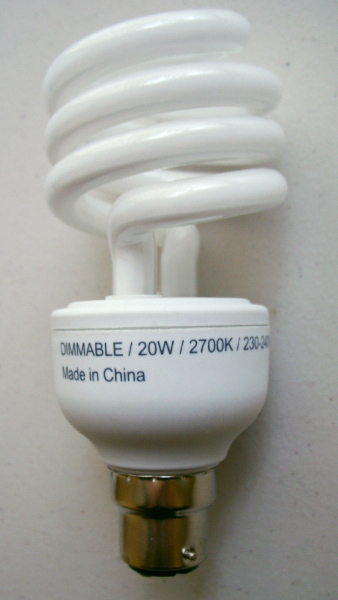
Dimmable integrated helical CFL that dims 2–100%, comparable to standard light bulb dimming properties

Only some CFLs are labeled for dimming control. Using a dimmer with a standard CFL is ineffective and can shorten bulb life and void the warranty. Dimmable CFLs are available. The dimmer switch used in conjunction with a dimmable CFL must be matched to its power consumption range; many dimmers installed for use with incandescent bulbs do not function acceptably below 40 W, whereas CFL applications commonly draw power in the range 7–20 W. Dimmable CFLs have been marketed before suitable dimmers are available. The dimming range of CFLs is usually between 20% and 90%, but many modern CFLs have a dimmable range of 2% to 100%, more akin to that of incandescent lights. There are two types of dimmable CFL on the market: Standard dimmable CFLs, and "switch-dimmable" CFLs. The latter use a standard light switch, and the on-board electronics chooses the light output level based on the number of times the switch is turned on and off quickly. Dimmable CFLs are not a 100% replacement for incandescent fixtures that are dimmed for "mood scenes" such as wall sconces in a dining area. Below the 20% limit, the lamp may remain at 20% or flicker or the starter circuitry may stop and restart. Above 80%, the bulb may operate at 100%. However, recent products have solved these problems so that they perform more like incandescent lamps. Dimmable CFLs are more expensive than standard CFLs due to the additional circuitry.

Cold-cathode CFLs can be dimmed to low levels, making them popular replacements for incandescent bulbs on dimmer circuits.

When a CFL is dimmed, its color temperature (warmth) stays the same. This is counter to incandescent light sources, where color gets redder as the light source gets dimmer. The Kruithof curve from 1934 described an empirical relationship between intensity and color temperature of visually pleasing light sources.

=== Power factor ===
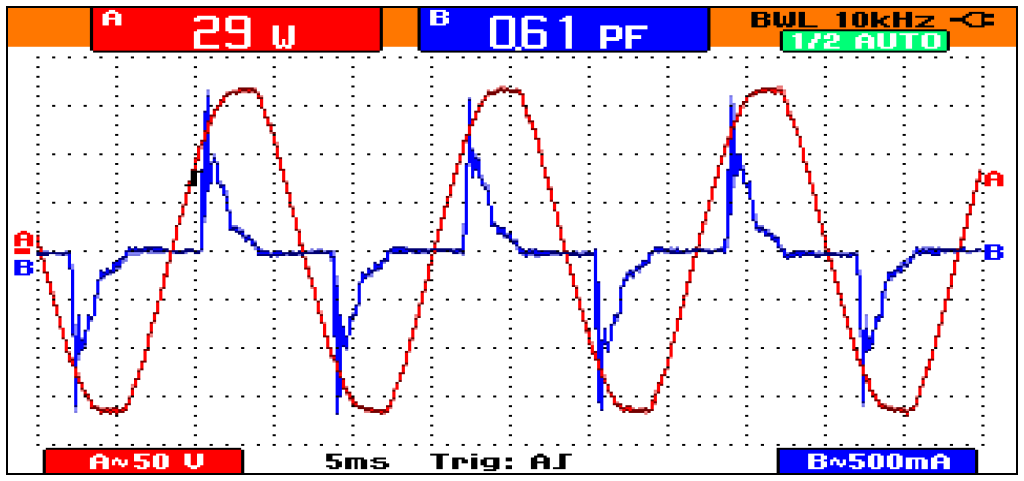
Voltage and current for a 120 V 60 Hz 30-watt compact fluorescent lamp. Because the current is heavily distorted, the power factor of this lamp is only 0.61. The lamp takes 29 watts, but 39 volt-amperes due to this distortion.

The input stage of a CFL is a rectifier, which presents a non-linear load to the power supply and introduces harmonic distortion on the current drawn from the supply. The use of CFLs in homes has no appreciable effect on power quality, but significant quantities of them in a large facility can have an adverse effect. The power factor of CFLs does not significantly affect their energy-saving benefits for individual consumers, but their use in large numbers, such as in commercial applications or across millions of homes in a distribution system, could require infrastructure upgrades. In such cases, CFLs with low (below 30 percent) total harmonic distortion (THD) and power factors greater than 0.9 should be selected.

=== Infrared signals ===
Electronic devices operated by infrared remote control can interpret the infrared light emitted by CFLs as a signal; this may limit the use of CFLs near televisions, radios, remote controls, or mobile phones. Energy Star certified CFLs must meet FCC standards, and so are required to list all known incompatibilities on the package.

=== Outdoor use ===
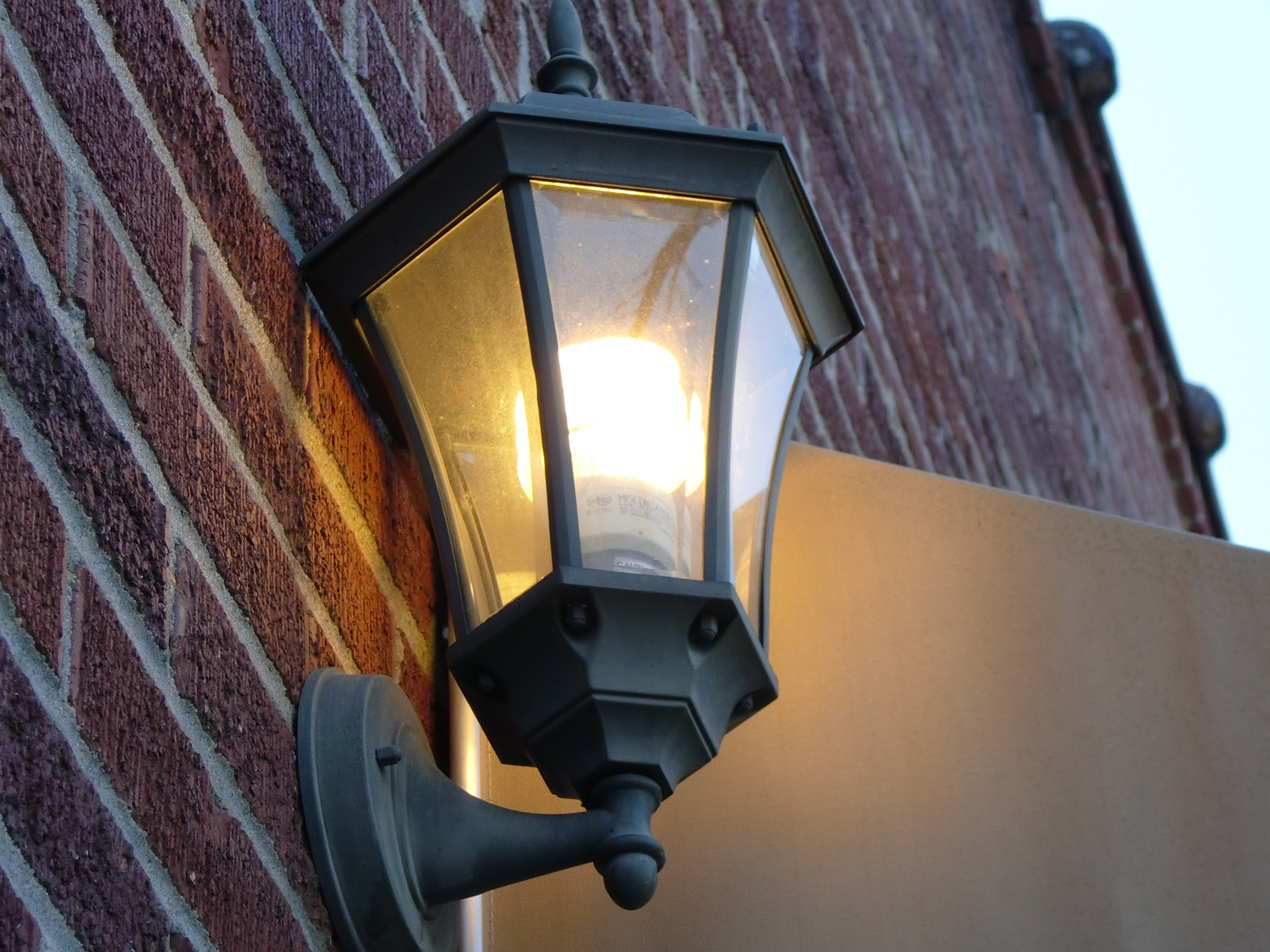
A CFL used outside of a building

CFLs are generally not designed or rated for outdoor use and some will not start in cold weather. CFLs are available with cold-weather ballasts, which may be rated to as low as −28.8 °C (−20 °F). Light output during the first few minutes of operation is limited at low temperatures before reaching full brightness. Cold-cathode CFLs will start and perform in a wide range of temperatures due to their different design.

=== Starting time ===
Incandescent lamps reach full brightness a fraction of a second after being switched on. As of 2009, CFLs turn on within a second, but many still take time to achieve full brightness. The light color may be slightly different immediately after being turned on. Some CFLs are marketed as "instant on" and have no noticeable warm-up period, but others can take up to a minute to reach full brightness, or longer in very cold temperatures. Some that use a mercury amalgam can take up to three minutes to reach full output. This and the shorter life of CFLs when turned on and off for short periods may make CFLs less suitable for applications such as motion-activated lighting. Hybrid lamps, combining a halogen lamp with a CFL, are available where warm up time is unacceptable. The halogen lamp lights immediately, and is switched off once the CFL has reached full brightness.

== Health and environmental impact ==
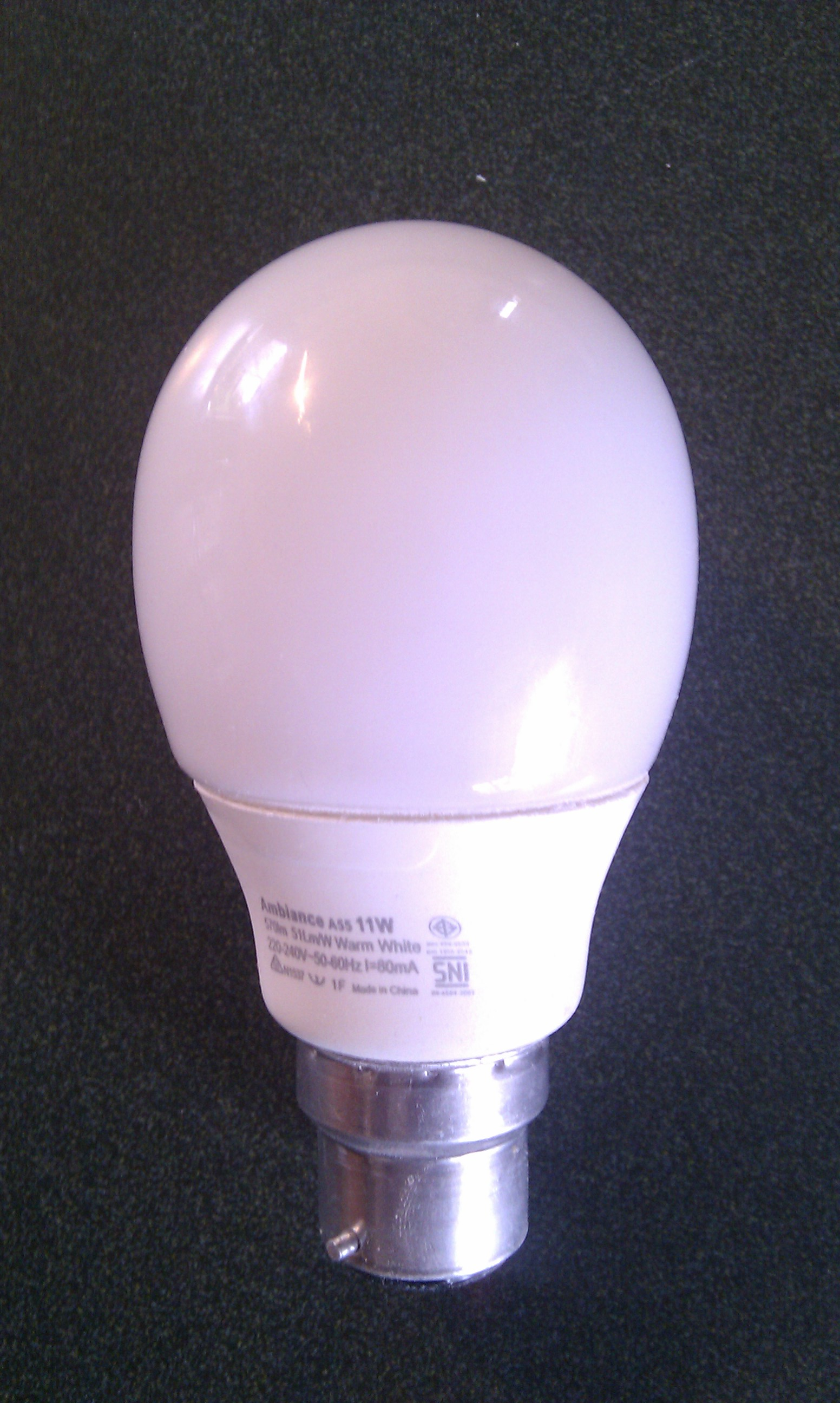
Closed double-envelope CFL

=== General ===
According to the European Commission Scientific Committee on Emerging and Newly Identified Health Risks (SCENIHR) in 2008, CFLs may pose an added health risk due to the ultraviolet and blue light emitted. This radiation could aggravate symptoms in people who already suffer skin conditions that make them exceptionally sensitive to light. The light emitted by some single-envelope CFLs at distances of less than 20 cm (7.9 in) could lead to ultraviolet exposures approaching the current workplace limit set to protect workers from skin and retinal damage. However, industry sources claim the UV radiation received from CFLs is too small to contribute to skin cancer and the use of double-envelope CFLs "largely or entirely" mitigates any other risks.

Tests have shown that radiation exposure from CFLs is negligible at 150 centimeter distance from the source. At closer distances, comparisons show that CFLs emit less UVA (long wavelength) radiation than incandescent light bulbs. They do, however, emit higher levels of UVB (short wavelength) radiation. UVB can penetrate deep into the skin while sufficient levels of UVA can burn superficial layers. Closed (double-envelope) CFLs are shielded and emit less total UV radiation than do incandescent or halogen bulbs of similar wattage.

For the average user, UV radiation from indoor lights does not appear to be a concern. For those with skin sensitivity long term indoor exposure may be a concern, in which case they may want to use a bulb with lower UV radiation output. There seems to be more variability within bulb types than between them, but the best option is shielded CFLs.

A 2012 study comparing cellular health effects of CFL light and incandescent light found statistically significant cell damage in cultures exposed to CFL light. Spectroscopic analysis confirmed the presence of significant UVA and UVC radiation, which the study's authors conjectured was attributable to damage in the bulbs' internal phosphor coatings. No cellular damage was observed following exposure to incandescent light of equivalent intensity. The study's authors suggest that the ultraviolet exposure could be limited by the use of "double-walled" bulbs manufactured with an additional glass covering surrounding the phosphor-coated layer.

When the base of the bulb is not made to be flame-retardant, as required in the voluntary standard for CFLs, overheating of the electrical components in the bulb may create a fire hazard.

=== Mercury content ===
Net mercury emissions for CFL and incandescent lamps, based on EPA FAQ sheet, assuming average U.S. emission of 0.012 mg of mercury per kilowatt-hour and 14% of CFL mercury contents escapes to environment after land fill disposal

CFLs, like all fluorescent lamps, contain mercury as vapor inside the glass tubing. Most CFLs contain 3–5 mg per bulb, with the bulbs labeled "eco-friendly" containing as little as 1 mg. Because mercury is poisonous, even these small amounts are a concern for landfills and waste incinerators where the mercury from lamps may be released and contribute to air and water pollution. In the U.S., lighting manufacturer members of the National Electrical Manufacturers Association (NEMA) have voluntarily capped the amount of mercury used in CFLs. In the EU the same cap is required by the RoHS law.

In areas where electric power is mostly generated in coal-fired stations, replacing incandescent bulbs by CFLs actually reduces mercury emissions. This is because the reduced electric power demand, reducing in turn the amount of mercury released by coal as it is burned, more than offsets the amount of mercury released from broken and discarded CFL bulbs. In July 2008 the U.S. EPA published a data sheet stating that the net system emission of mercury for CFL lighting was lower than for incandescent lighting of comparable lumen output. This was based on the average rate of mercury emission for U.S. electricity production and average estimated escape of mercury from a CFL put into a landfill. Coal-fired plants also emit other heavy metals, sulfur, and carbon dioxide.

In the United States, the U.S. Environmental Protection Agency estimated that if all 270 million CFLs sold in 2007 were sent to landfill sites, around 0.13 metric tons of mercury would be released, 0.1% of all U.S. emissions of mercury (around 104 metric tons that year). The graph assumes that CFLs last an average of 8,000 hours regardless of manufacturer and premature breakage. In areas where coal is not used to produce energy, the emissions would be less for both types of bulb.

Special handling instructions for breakage are not printed on the packaging of household CFL bulbs in many countries. The amount of mercury released by one bulb can temporarily exceed U.S. federal guidelines for chronic exposure. Chronic, however, implies exposure for a significant time, and it remains unclear what the health risks are from short-term exposure to low levels of elemental mercury. Despite following EPA best-practice clean-up guidelines on broken CFLs, researchers were unable to remove mercury from carpet, and agitation of the carpet — such as by young children playing — created localized concentrations as high as 0.025 mg/m^{3} in air close to the carpet, even weeks after the initial breakage.

The U.S. Environmental Protection Agency (EPA) has published best practices for cleanup of broken CFLs, and ways to avoid breakage, on its web site. It recommends airing out the room and carefully disposing of broken pieces in a jar. A Maine Department of Environmental Protection (DEP) study of 2008 comparing clean-up methods warns that using plastic bags to store broken CFL bulbs is dangerous, because vapors well above safe levels continue to leak from the bags. The EPA and the Maine DEP recommend a sealed glass jar as the best repository for a broken bulb.

Since the end of 2018, the export, import and manufacture of CFLs within the European Union has been prohibited under the EU Mercury Regulation.

=== Recycling ===
Health and environmental concerns about mercury have prompted many jurisdictions to require spent lamps to be properly disposed of or recycled, rather than being included in the general waste stream sent to landfills. Safe disposal requires storing the bulbs unbroken until they can be processed.

In the United States, most states have adopted and currently implement the federal Universal Waste Rule (UWR). Several states, including Vermont, New Hampshire, California, Minnesota, New York, Maine, Connecticut and Rhode Island, have regulations that are more stringent than the federal UWR. Home-supply chain stores make free CFL recycling widely available.

In the European Union, CFLs are one of many products subject to the WEEE recycling scheme. The retail price includes an amount to pay for recycling, and manufacturers and importers have an obligation to collect and recycle CFLs.

According to the Northwest Compact Fluorescent Lamp Recycling Project, because household users in the U.S. Northwest have the option of disposing of these products in the same way they dispose of other solid waste, in Oregon "a large majority of household CFLs are going to municipal solid waste". They also note the EPA's estimates for the percentage of fluorescent lamps' total mercury released when they are disposed of in the following ways: municipal waste landfill 3.2%, recycling 3%, municipal waste incineration 17.55% and hazardous waste disposal 0.2%.

The first step of processing CFLs involves crushing the bulbs in a machine that uses negative pressure ventilation and a mercury-absorbing filter or cold trap to contain mercury vapor. Many municipalities are purchasing such machines. The crushed glass and metal is stored in drums, ready for shipping to recycling factories.

=== Greenhouse gases ===
In some places, such as Quebec and British Columbia in 2007, central heating for homes was provided mostly by the burning of natural gas, whereas electricity was primarily provided by hydroelectric power. An analysis of the impacts of a ban on incandescent light bulbs at that time introduced the notion that in such areas, heat generated by conventional electric light bulbs may have been significantly reducing the release of greenhouse gases from natural gas heating. Ivanco, Karney, and Waher estimated that "If all homes in Quebec were required to switch from (incandescent) bulbs to CFLs, there would be an increase of almost 220,000 tonnes in CO_{2} emissions in the province, equivalent to the annual emissions from more than 40,000 automobiles."

== Use and adoption ==
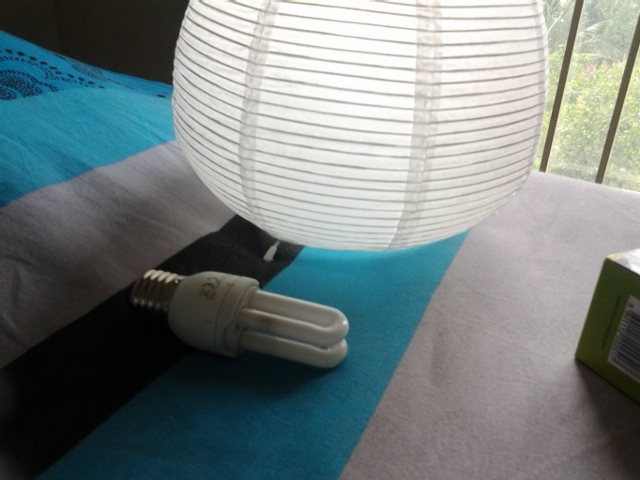
An E27 Philips 5 watt CFL

CFLs are produced for both alternating current (AC) and direct current (DC) input. DC CFLs are popular for use in recreational vehicles and off-the-grid housing. Various aid agency initiatives exist in developing countries to replace kerosene lamps, which have associated health and safety hazards, with CFLs powered by batteries, solar panels or wind power generators.

Due to the potential to reduce electric consumption and pollution, various organizations have encouraged the adoption of CFLs and other efficient lighting. Efforts range from publicity to encourage awareness, to direct handouts of CFLs to the public. Some electric utilities and local governments have subsidized CFLs or provided them free to customers as a means to reduce electric demand; and so delay further investments in generation.

In the United States, the Program for the Evaluation and Analysis of Residential Lighting (PEARL) was created to be a watchdog program. PEARL has evaluated the performance and Energy Star compliance of more than 150 models of CFL bulbs.

The UN Environment Programme (UNEP)/Global Environment Facility (GEF) initiative has developed "The Global Efficient Partnership Program", which focuses on country-led policies and approaches to enable the implementation of energy-efficient lighting, including CFLs, quickly and cost-effectively in developing and emerging countries.

In the United States and Canada, the Energy Star program labels lamps that meet a set of standards for efficiency, starting time, life expectancy, color, and consistency of performance. The intent of the program is to reduce consumer concerns due to variable quality of products. Those CFLs with a recent Energy Star certification start in less than one second and do not flicker. Energy Star Light Bulbs for Consumers is a resource for finding and comparing Energy Star qualified lamps. There is ongoing work in improving the "quality" (color rendering index) of the light.

In the United States, new standards proposed by the United States Department of Energy could result in LED lamps replacing CFLs. In the opinion of Noah Horowitz of the Natural Resources Defense Council, most CFL bulbs would not meet the standards.

In the United Kingdom, a similar program is run by the Energy Saving Trust to identify lighting products that meet energy conservation and performance guidelines.

The G24 (624Q2) and GU24 lamp fitting socket systems were designed to replace the traditional lamp sockets, so that incandescent bulbs are not installed in fixtures intended for energy efficient lamps only.

== Efficiency comparison ==
	Incandescent	Halogen	Fluorescent	LED			
	Incandescent	Halogen	Fluorescent	Generic	Philips	Philips L Prize	Daylight (TCP)
Electric power (W)	60	42	14	10	12.5	9.7	9.8
Light output (lm)	860	650	800	800	800	910	950
Luminous efficacy (lm/W)	14.3	14.42	57.14	80	64	93.4	96.94
Color temperature (K)	2700	3100	2700	3000	2700	2727	5000
CRI	100	100	>75	>85	85	93	Not listed
Lifespan (h)	1000	2500	8000	25,000	25,000	30,000	25,000

== See also ==
- Fluorescent lamp
