= Light fixture =

Electrical device with an electric lamp

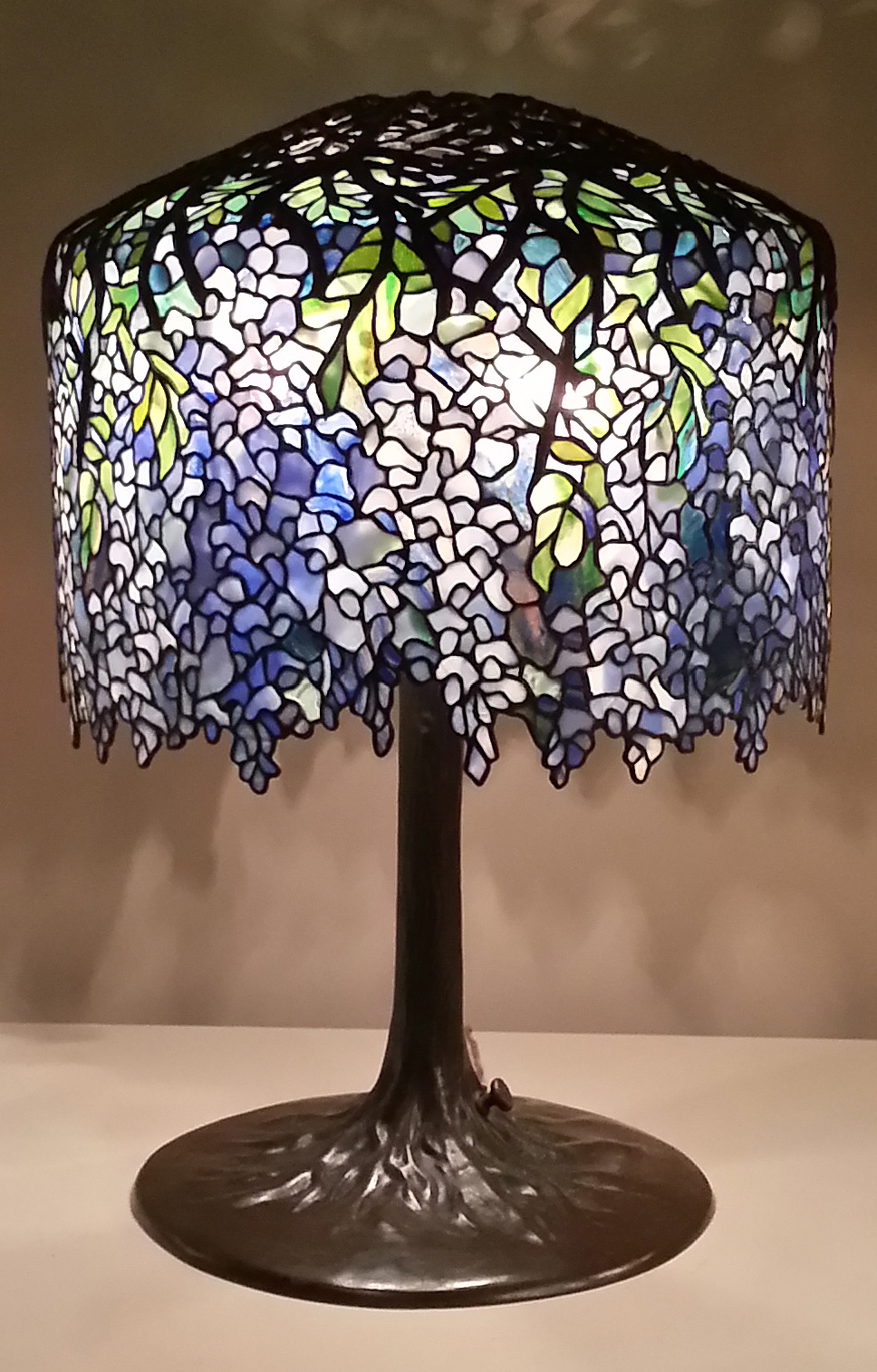
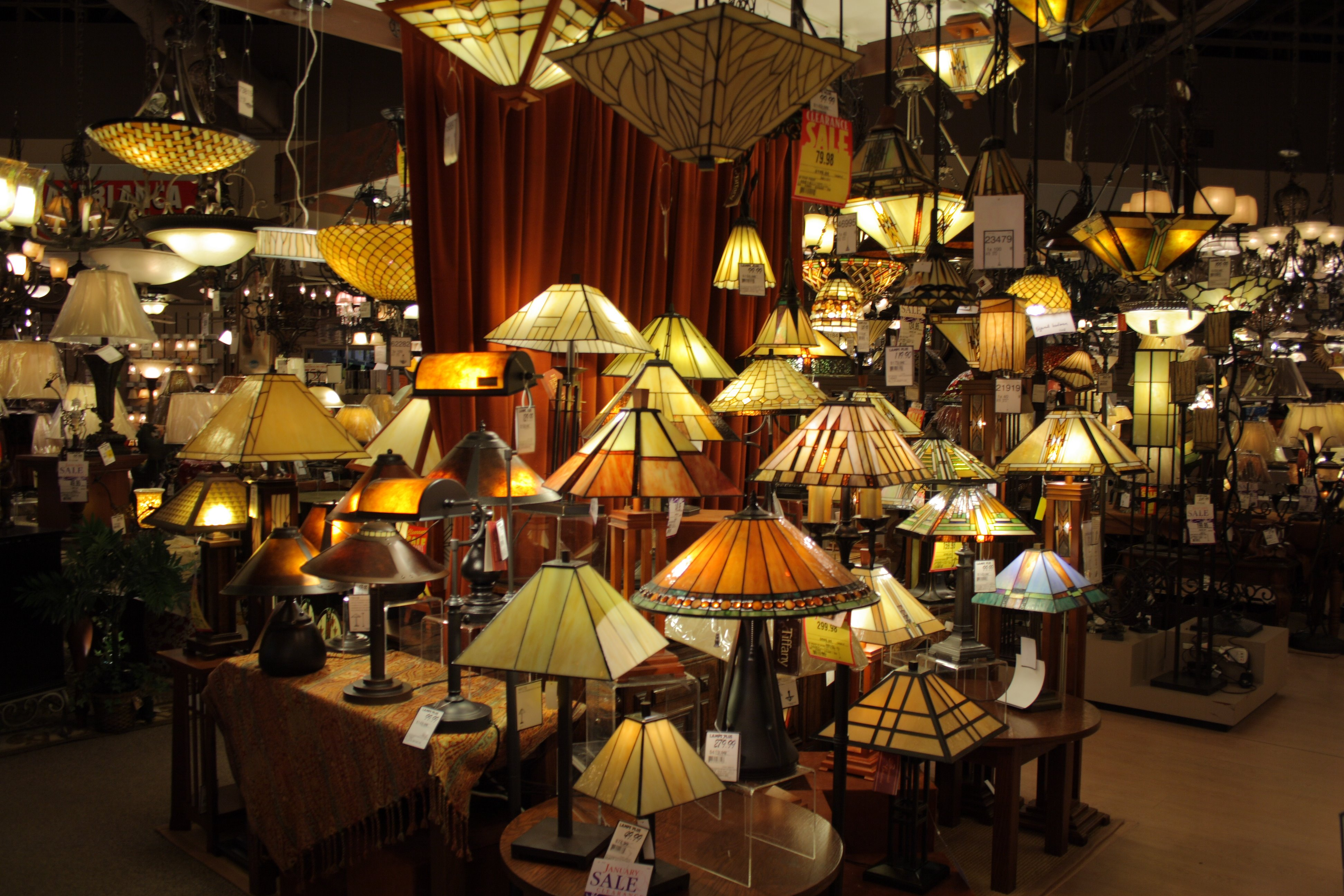
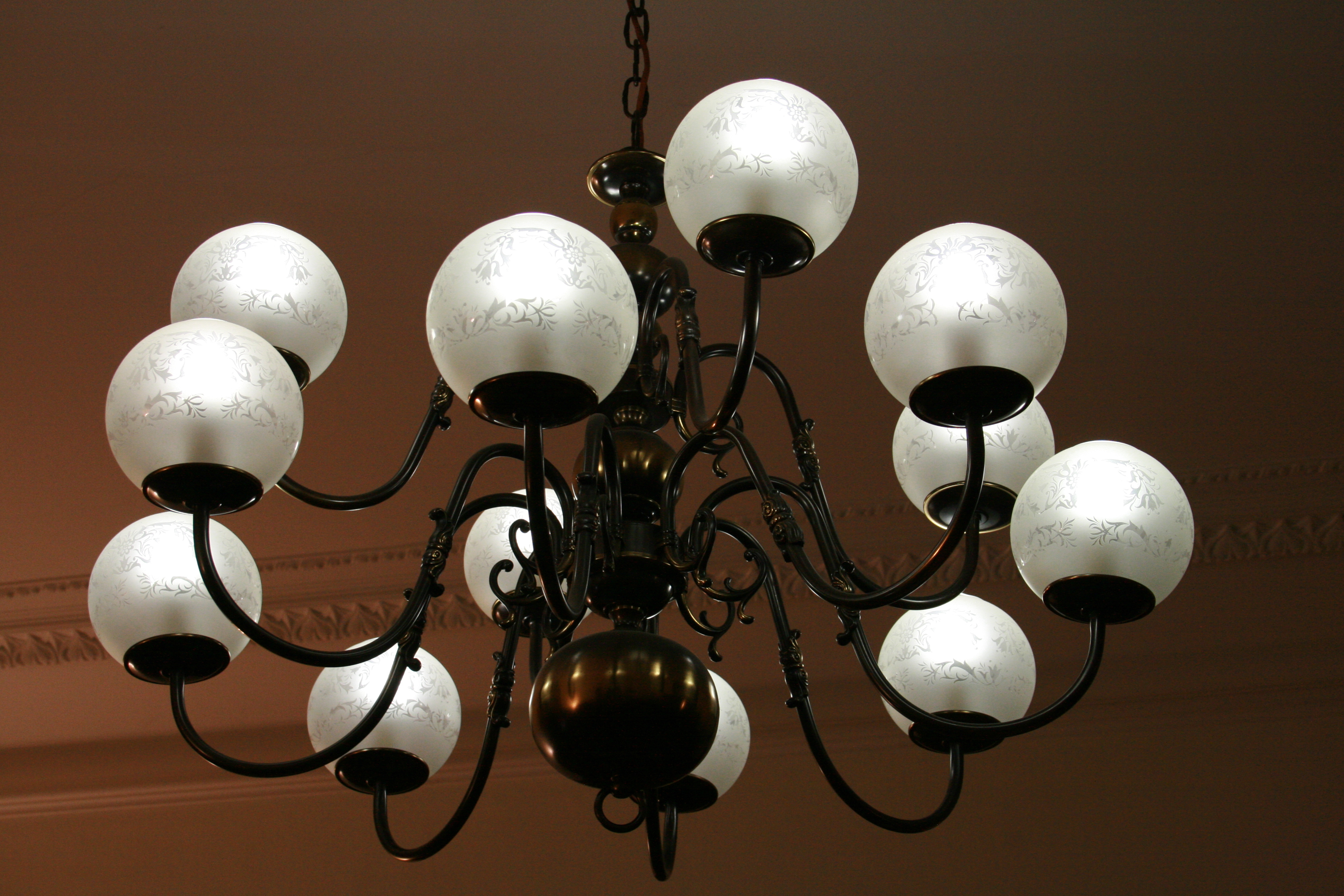
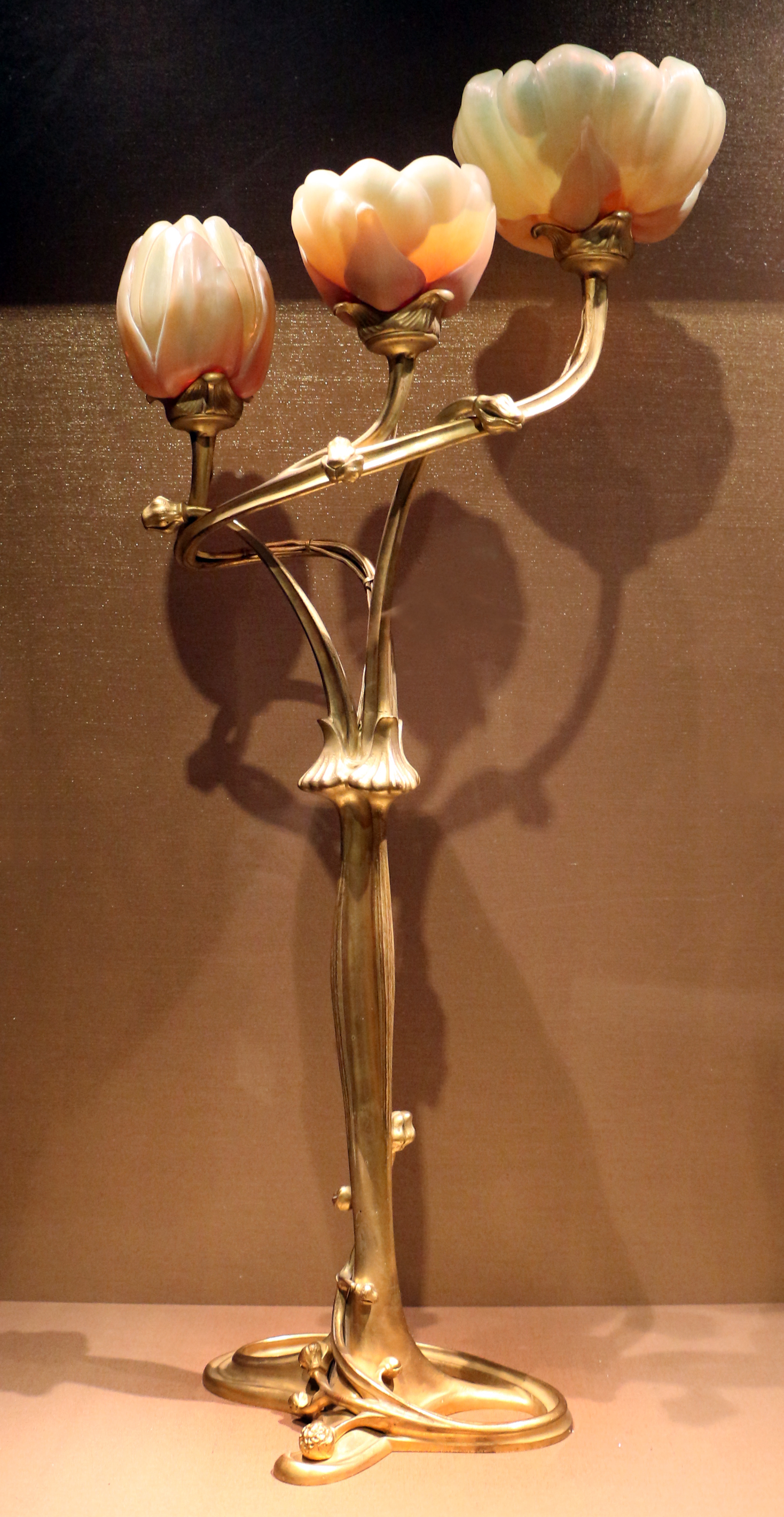
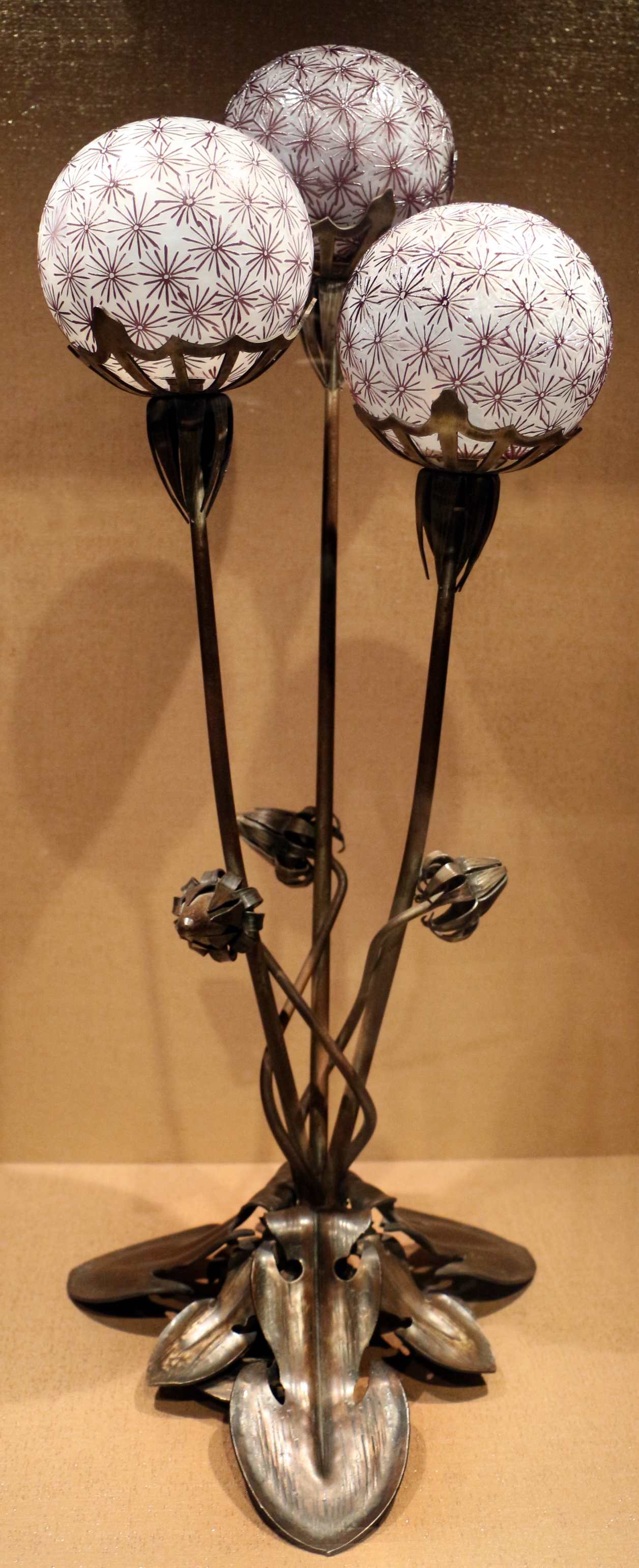
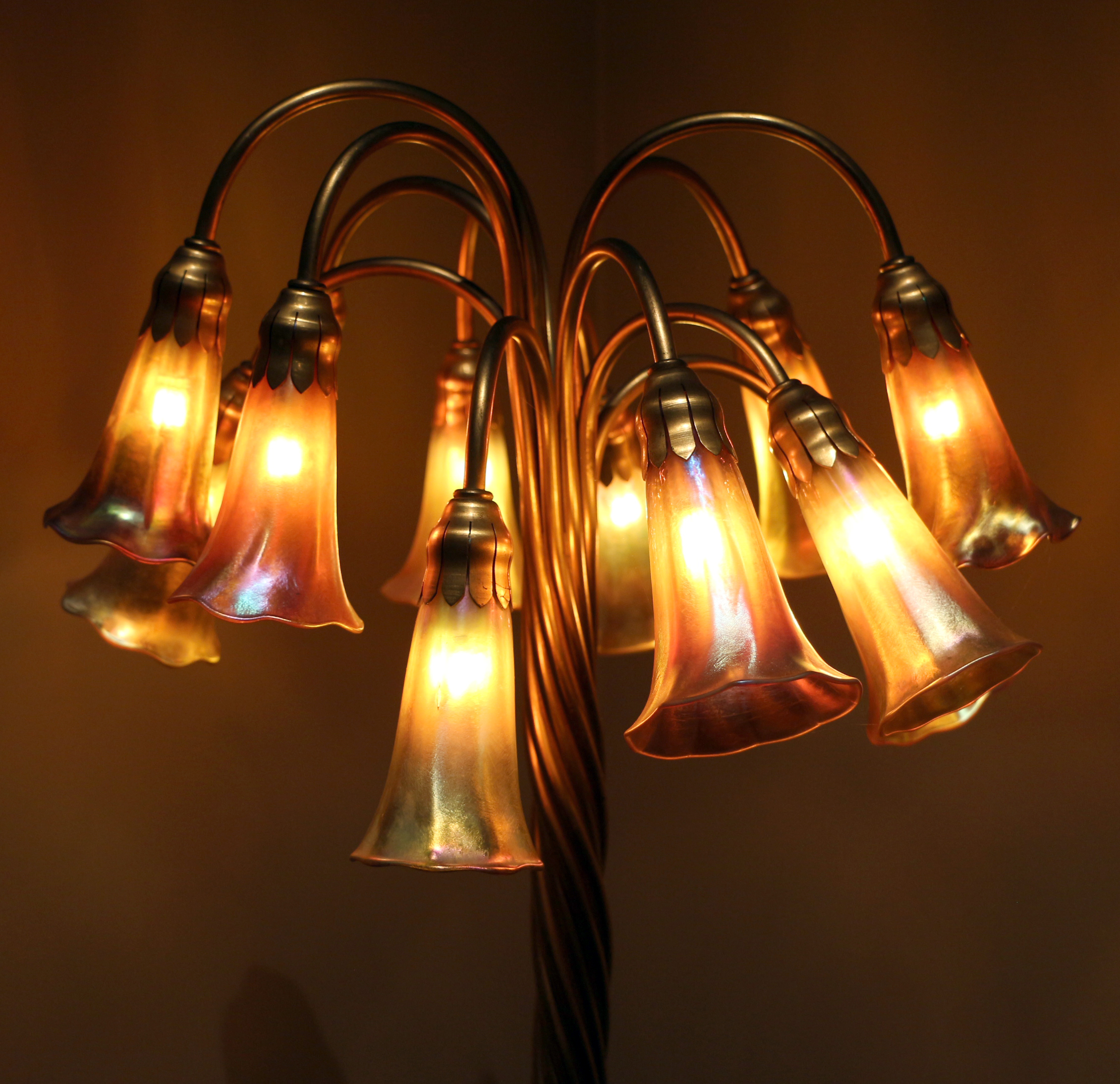
Various examples of light fixtures throughout history

A light fixture (US English), light fitting (UK English) or luminaire is an electrical lighting device containing one or more light sources, such as light bulbs, and all the accessory components required for its operation to provide illumination to the environment. All light fixtures have a fixture body and one or more light sources. The sources may be in sockets for easy replacement; in the case of some LED fixtures, they may be hard-wired in place.

Fixtures may also have a switch to control the light, either attached to the housing (i.e., chassis) or—in the case of some portable luminaires—attached to the power cable. Permanent light fixtures, such as dining room chandeliers, may have no switch on the fixture itself, but rely on a wall switch.

Fixtures require an electrical connection to a power source, typically AC mains power, but some run on battery power for camping or emergency lights. Permanent lighting fixtures are directly wired. Movable lamps have a plug and cord that plugs into a wall socket.

Light fixtures may also have other features, such as reflectors for directing the light, an aperture (with or without a lens), an outer shell or housing for lamp alignment and protection, an electrical ballast or power supply, and a shade to diffuse the light or direct it towards a workspace (e.g., a desk lamp). A wide variety of special light fixtures are created for use in the automotive lighting industry, aerospace, marine and medicine sectors.

Portable light fixtures are often called lamps, as in table lamp or desk lamp. In technical terminology, the lamp is the light source, which, in casual terminology, is called the light bulb. Both the International Electrotechnical Commission (IEC) and the Illuminating Engineering Society (IES) recommend the term luminaire for technical use.

== History ==
Fixture manufacturing began soon after production of the incandescent light bulb. When practical uses of fluorescent lighting were realized after 1924, the three leading companies to produce various fixtures were Lightolier, Artcraft Fluorescent Lighting Corporation, and Globe Lighting in the United States.

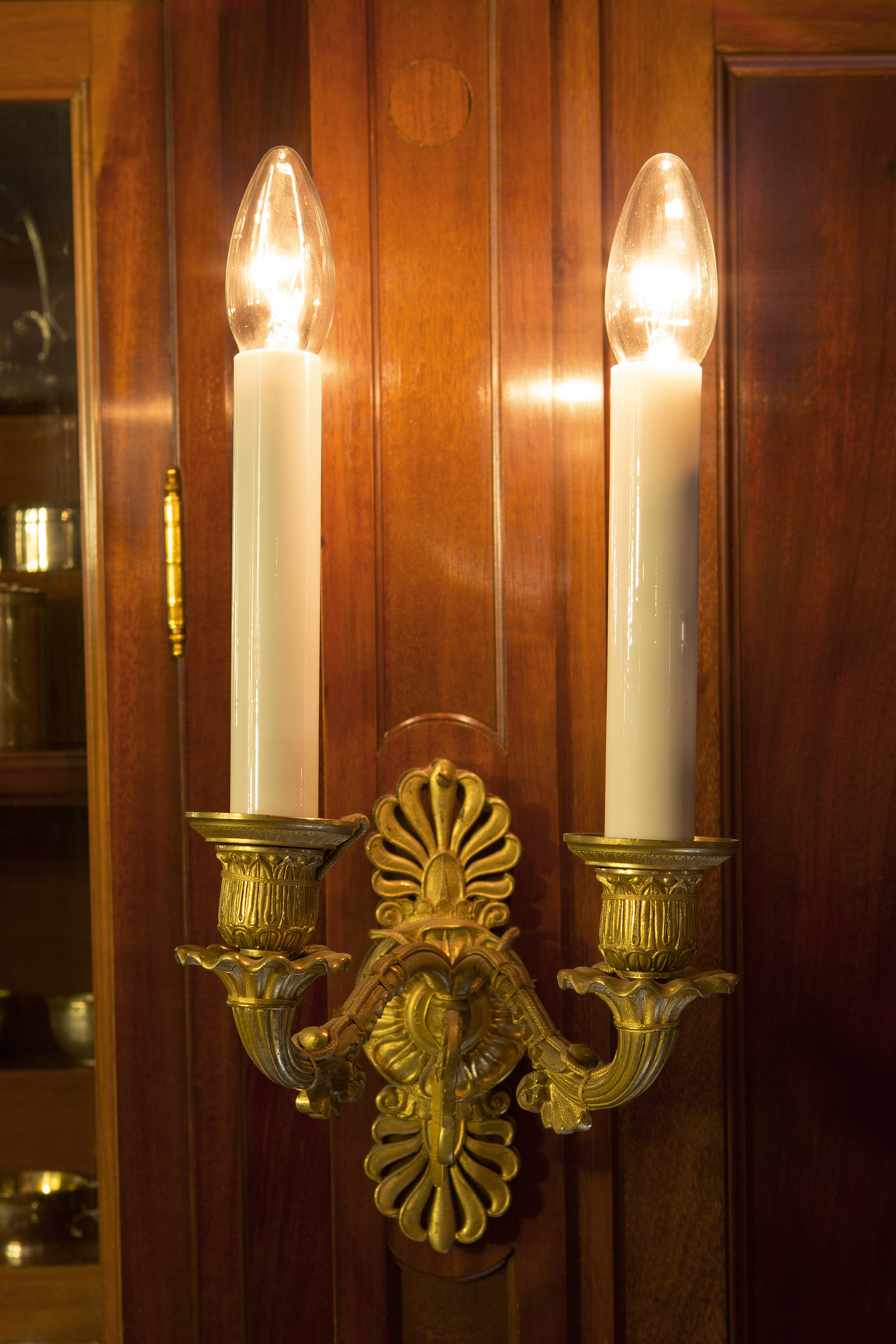
Neoclassical light fixture; mid-19th century; bronze; height: 18 cm; Hallwyl Museum (Stockholm, Sweden)

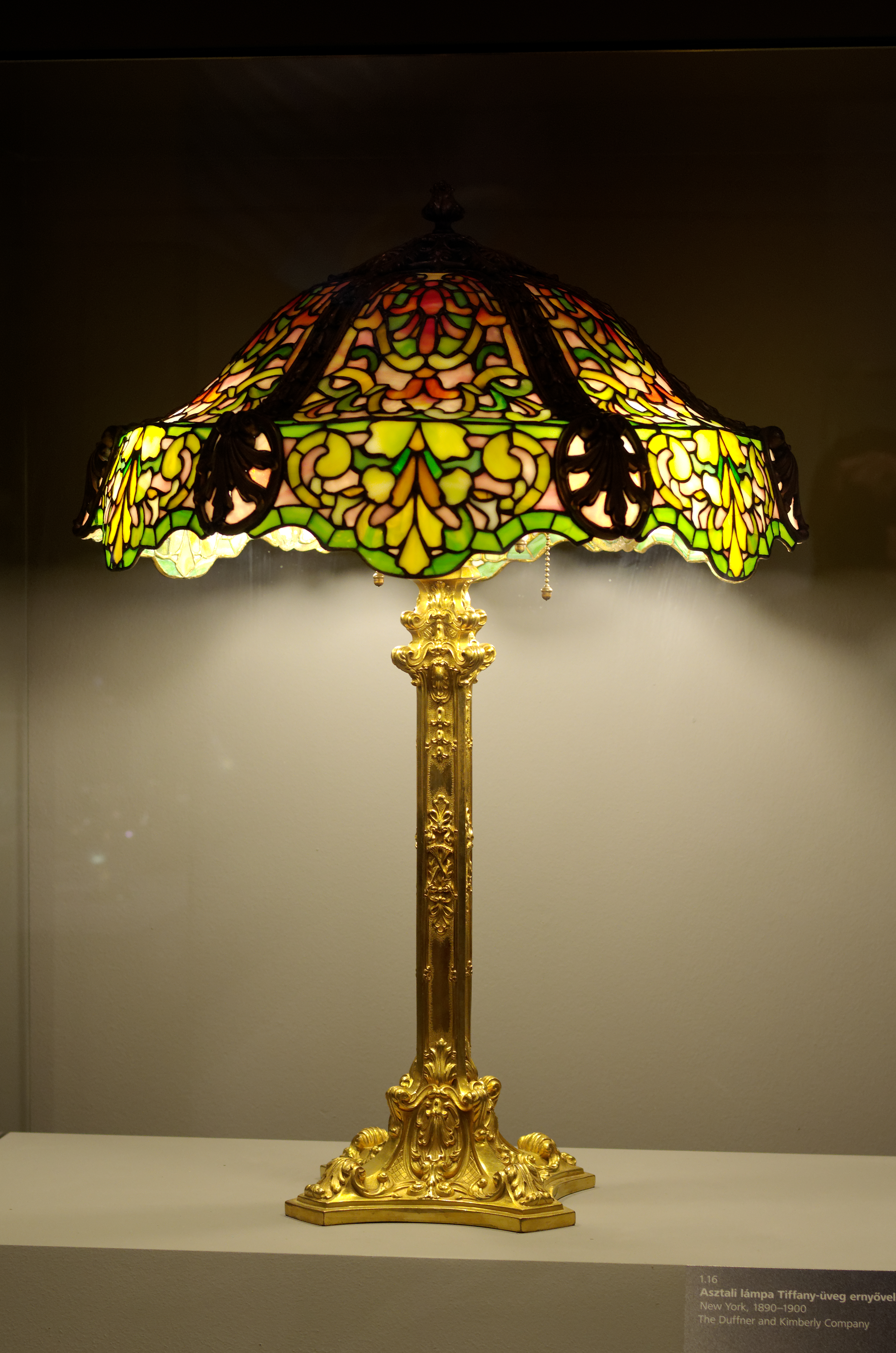
Lamp and lampshade made of Tiffany glass; c. 1890–1900; Budapest Museum of Applied Arts (Budapest, Hungary)

== Fixture types ==
Light fixtures are classified by how the fixture is installed, the light function or lamp type.

=== Free-standing or portable ===
- Table lamp fixtures, standard lamp fixtures, and office task light luminaires.
  - Balanced-arm lamp is a spot light with an adjustable arm such as anglepoise, RAMUN or Luxo L1.
  - Gooseneck (fixture)
  - Nightlight
- Floor Lamp
  - Torch lamp or torchières are floor lamps with an upward-facing shade. They provide general lighting to the rest of the room.
  - Gooseneck lamp
- Bouillotte lamp: see Bouillotte

=== Fixed ===
- Ceiling dome – the light source(s) are hidden behind a translucent dome typically made of glass, often frosted or textured to diffuse the light.
  - Open ceiling dome (semi-flush mount) – the translucent dome is suspended 50 mm to 300 mm (2–12") below the ceiling.
  - Enclosed ceiling dome (flush-mount) – the translucent dome mates with a ring that is mounted flush with the ceiling.
  - Both types commonly have a knob at the center of the dome that can be turned or pulled to release the dome. The similarity of the dome and knob to a breast led to the nickname "boob lights" for this type of fixture.
- Recessed light – the protective housing is concealed behind a ceiling or wall, leaving only the fixture itself exposed. The ceiling-mounted version is often called a downlight.
  - "Cans" with a variety of lamps – this term is jargon for inexpensive downlighting products that are recessed into the ceiling, or sometimes for uplights placed on the floor. The name comes from the shape of the housing. The term "pot lights" is often used in Canada and parts of the US.
  - Cove light – indirect lighting recessed into the ceiling in a long box against a wall.
  - Troffer – recessed fluorescent light fixtures, usually rectangular in shape to fit into a drop ceiling grid.

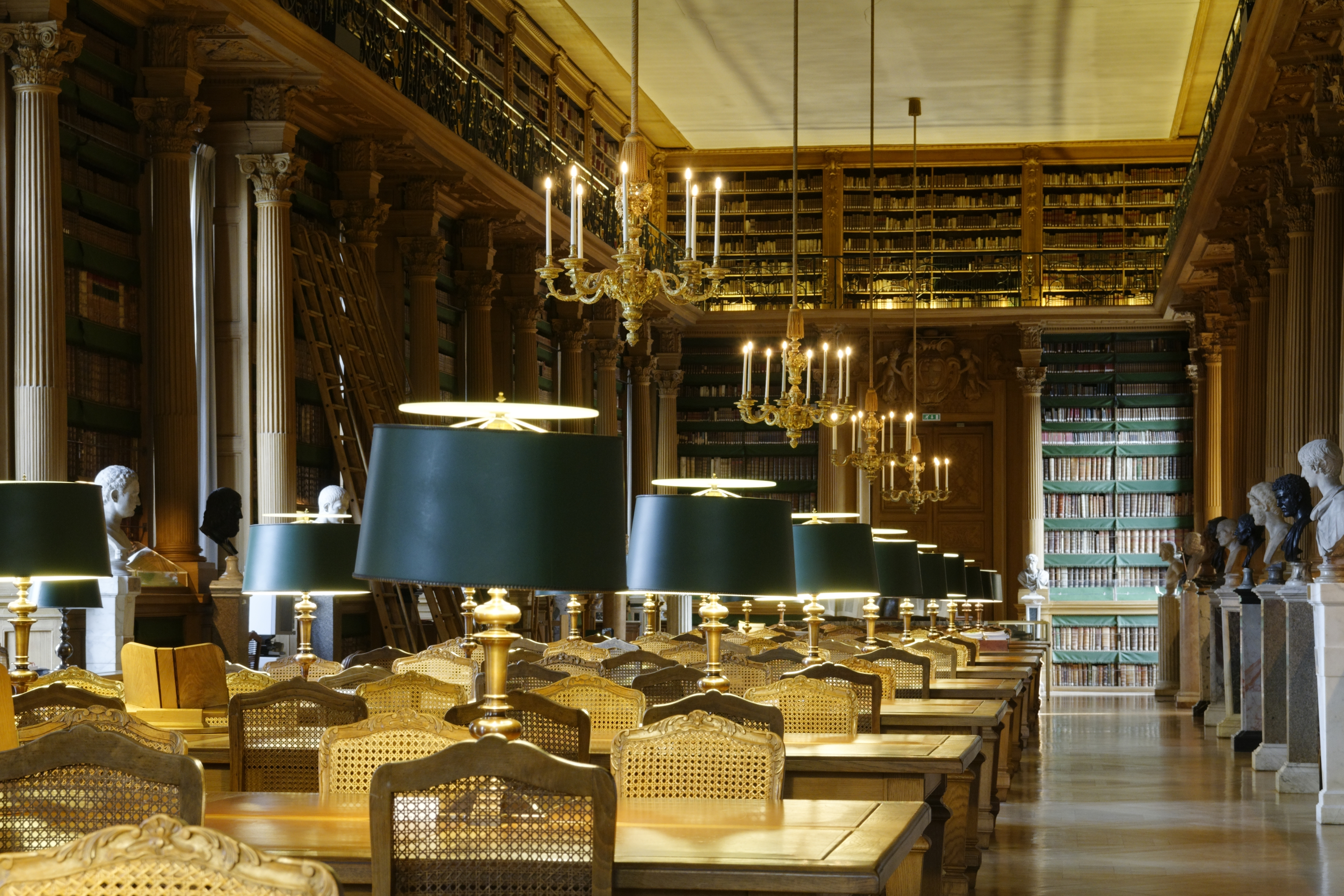
Chandeliers and table lamps in the Bibliothèque Mazarine (Paris)

- Surface-mounted light – the finished housing is exposed, not flush with the surface.
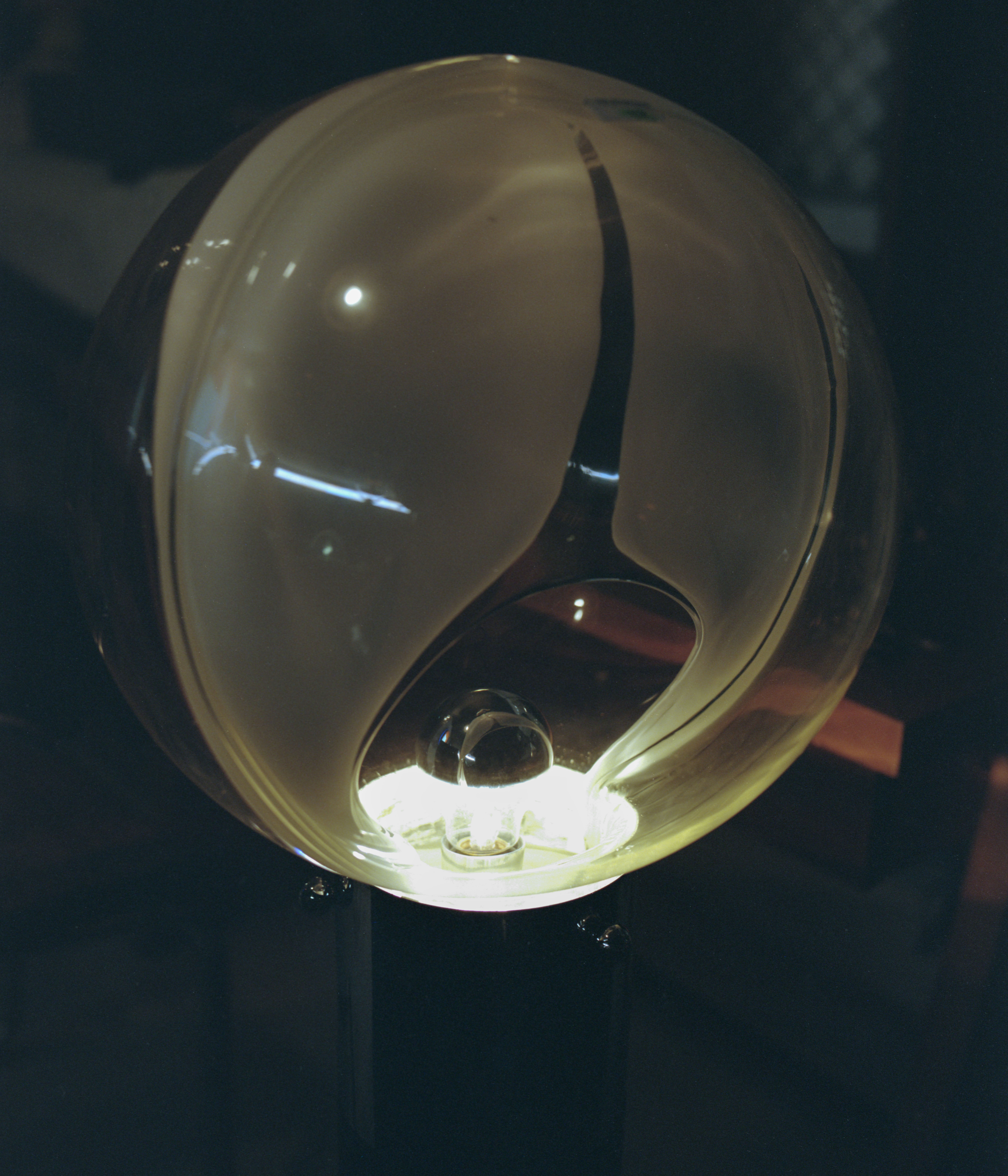
  Low-bay lighting with sphere outline
  - Chandelier – Ceiling light fixture
  - Pendant light – suspended from the ceiling with a chain or pipe.
  - Sconce – provide up or down lights; can be used to illuminate artwork, architectural details; commonly used in hallways or as an alternative to overhead lighting.
  - Track lighting fixture – individual fixtures ("track heads") can be positioned anywhere along the track, which provides electric power.
  - Under-cabinet light – mounted below kitchen wall cabinets.
  - Display case or showcase light – shows merchandise on display within an enclosed case such as jewelry, grocery stores, and chain stores.
  - Ceiling fan – may sometimes have a light, often referred to as a light kit mounted to it. Ceiling fans with built-in lights may eliminate the need for separate overhead light fixtures in a room, and light kits can also replace any ceiling-mounted light fixtures that were displaced by the installation of the ceiling fan.
  - Emergency lighting or exit sign – connected to a battery backup or to an electric circuit that has emergency power if the mains power fails.
  - High- and low-bay lighting – typically used for general industrial lighting in retail, big-box stores, warehouses and workshops, and is characterised by wide beam angles and diffused light, but minimal glare, making the lamps suitable for use in a wide range of environments. Such lamps are usually divided into the categories of low-bay lighting for ceiling heights around 3.5 to 6 meters, and high-bay lighting for ceiling heights of 6 to 14 meters.
  - LED strip light – flexible LEDs that usually comes with an adhesive backing, used for accent lighting, backlighting, task lighting, and decorative lighting applications, such as cove lighting
  - Strip lights or industrial lighting – often long lines of fluorescent lamps used in a warehouse or factory.

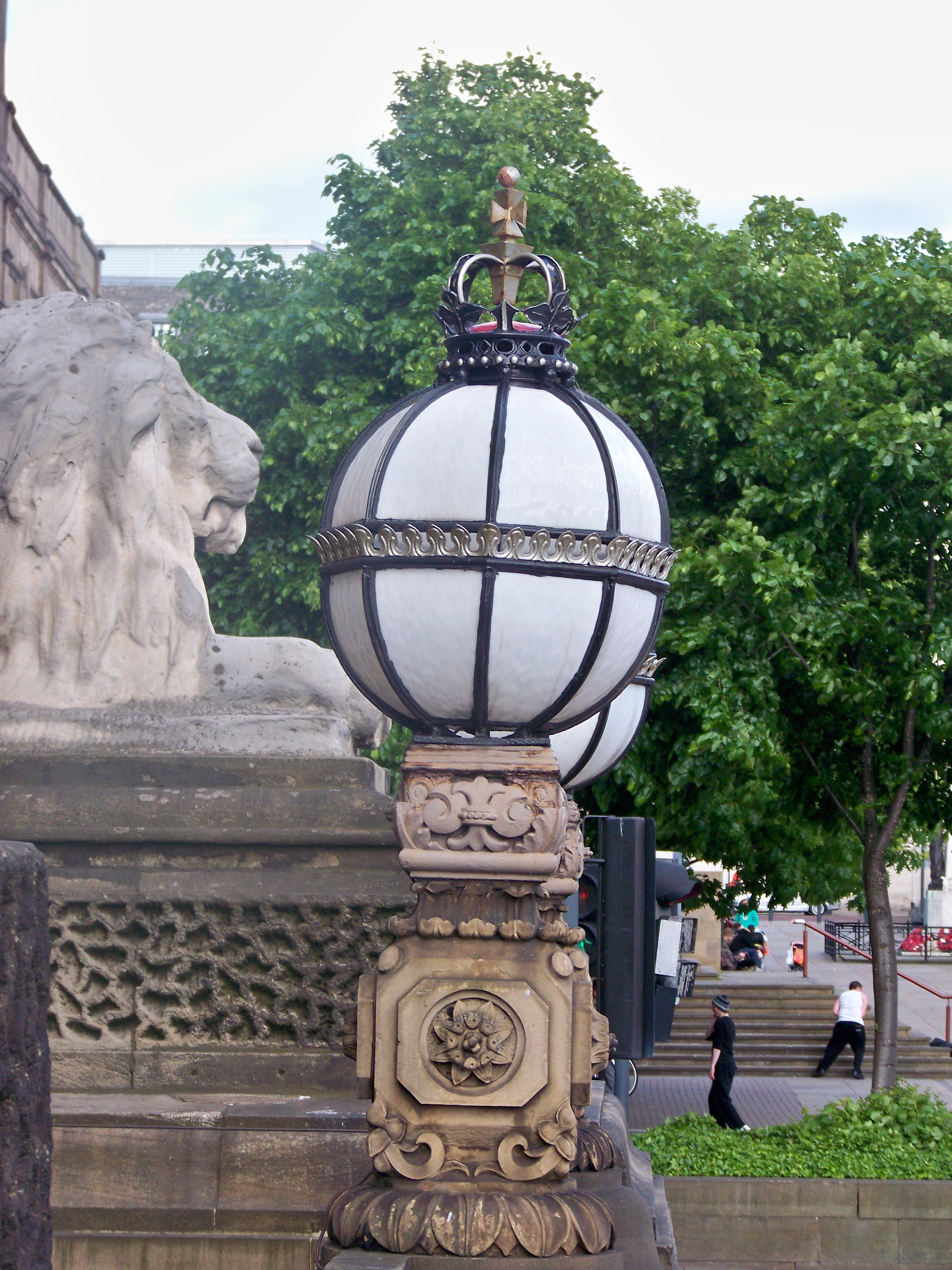
A decorative outdoor lamp at Leeds Town Hall

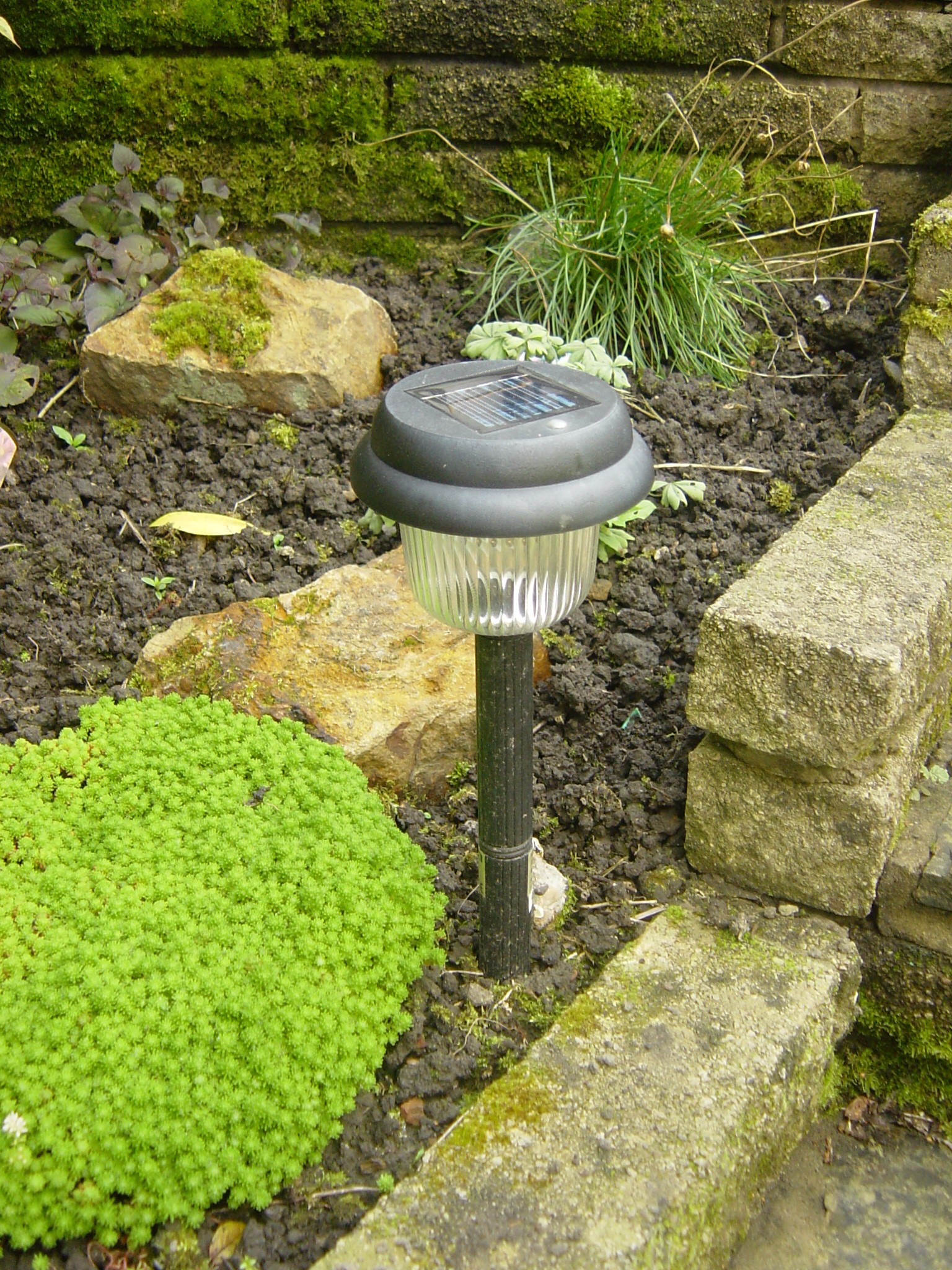
A garden solar lamp is an example of landscape lighting

- Outdoor lighting and landscape lighting – used to illuminate walkways, parking lots, roadways, building exteriors and architectural details, gardens, and parks. Outdoor light fixtures can also include forms similar to indoor lighting, such as pendants, flush or close-to-ceiling light fixtures, wall-mounted lanterns and dome lights.
  - High-mast, usually pole – or stanchion-mounted – for landscape, roadways, and parking lots.
  - Bollard – a type of architectural outdoor lighting that is a short, upright ground-mounted unit typically used to provide cutoff type illumination for egress lighting, to light walkways, steps, or other pathways.
  - Solar lamp
  - Street light
  - Yard light

=== Special-purpose lights ===
- Accent light – any directional light that highlights an object or attracts attention to a particular area.
- Background light – for use in video production.
- Blacklight
- Christmas lights – also called fairy lights or twinkle lights and are often used at Christmas and other holidays for decoration.
- Dock light - provides light for boating safety. Typically affixed atop pilings or directly upon the dock floor itself.
- Emergency light – provides minimal light to a building during a power outage.
- Exit sign
- Flood light
- Safelight (for use in a darkroom)
- Safety lamp (for use in coal mines)
- Searchlight (for military and advertising use)
- Security lighting
- Step light or stair lighting, light fixture that illuminates stairs for better visibility in the dark
- Strobe light
- Task light
- Traffic light
- Theatrical
  - Stage lighting instrument
  - Intelligent lighting
  - Followspot
- Wallwasher

== Lamp types ==
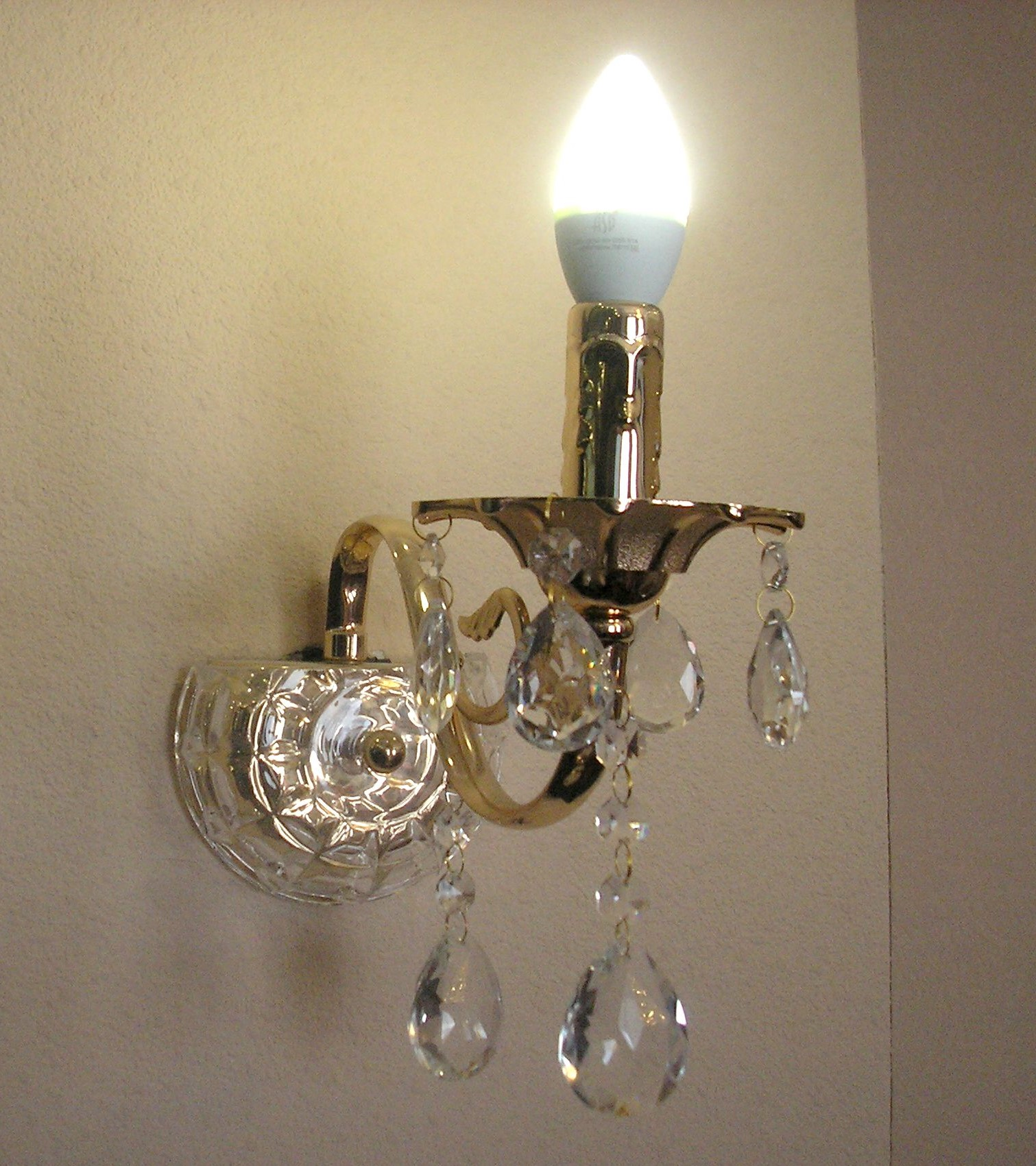
A decorative Wall Light

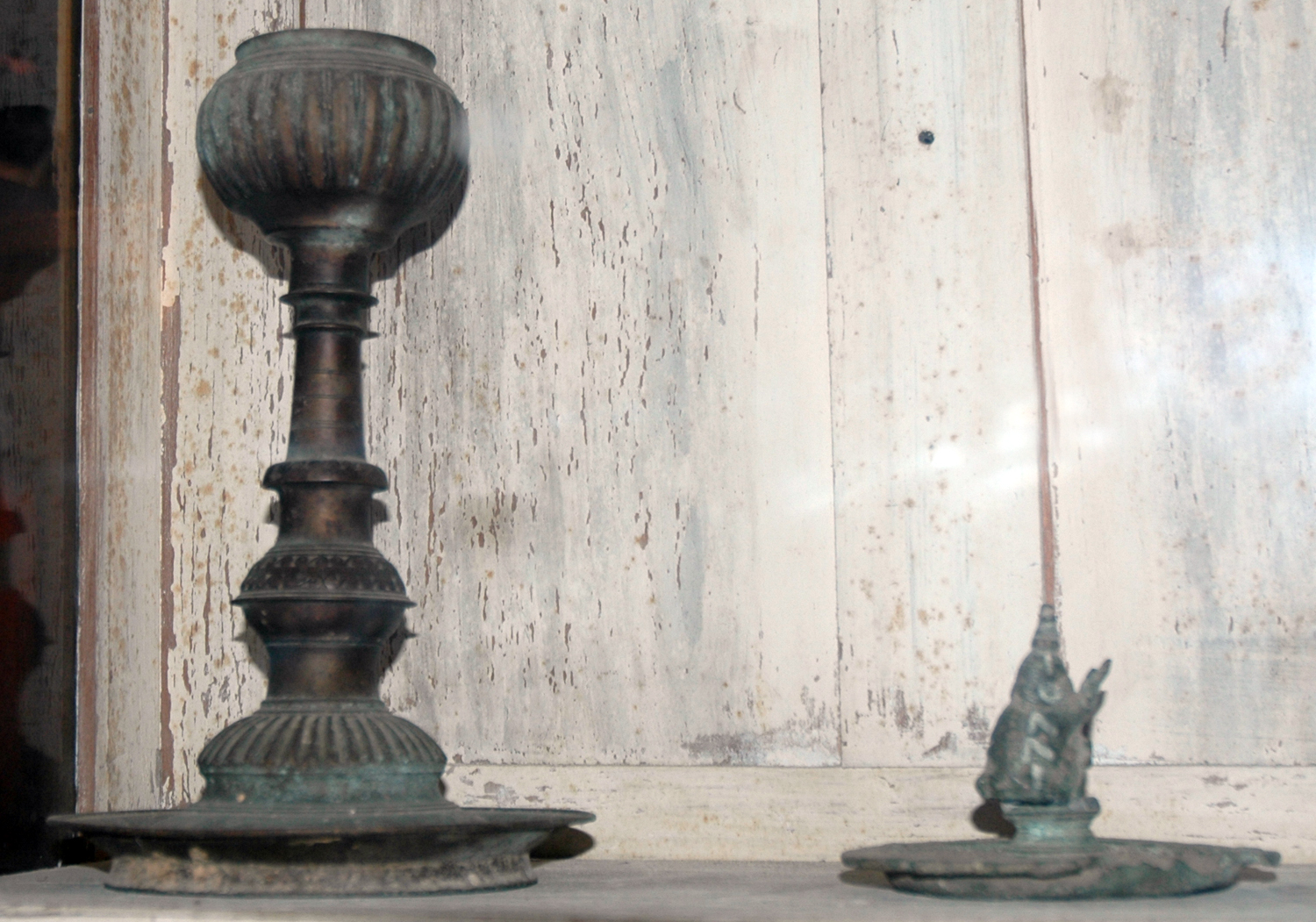
Old table lamps at Archaeological Museum, Sri Lanka

- Arc lamps

Xenon arc lamp, Yablochkov candle

- Fluorescent

Fluorescent lamp, compact fluorescent lamp (CFL), Induction lamp, blacklight.

- Fuel lamps

Betty lamp, butter lamp, carbide lamp, gas lighting, kerosene lamp, oil lamp, rush light, torch, candle, Limelight, gas mantle
Safety lamps: Davy lamp and Geordie lamp

- Gas-discharge lamp and high-intensity discharge lamp (HID)

Mercury-vapor lamp, Metal-halide (HMI, HQI, CDM), Sodium vapor or "high-pressure sodium", neon sign

- Incandescent lamp

A-lamp, Parabolic aluminized reflector lamp (PAR), reflector lamp (R), bulged reflector lamp (BR) (refer to lamp shapes)
- Obsolete types: limelight, carbon button lamp, Mazda (light bulb), Nernst glower
- Novelty: Lava lamp
- Special purpose: heat lamp, Globar, gas mantle
- Halogen – special class of incandescent lamps

- Nuclear: self-powered lighting
- Plasma lamp
- LED (solid-state lighting)

== Light-fixture controls ==
There are various types of devices used to manage the amount of light used:

- 3-way 2-circuit switch
- Dimmer (this allows the user to make a light brighter or dimmer, typically using a rotary dial)
- Light switch (often part of the light socket or power cord on portable fixtures)
- Lighting control system
- Motion detector
- Timer
- Touch
- X10 systems

== See also ==
- Architectural lighting design
- Coefficient of utilization
- Flashlight
- History of street lighting in the United States
- Lantern
- Lampshade
- Lightbulb socket
- Lighting designer for the theater
- Luminous efficacy
- Timeline of lighting technology
- Light pollution
