= Accent lighting =

Light focused on a particular area or object

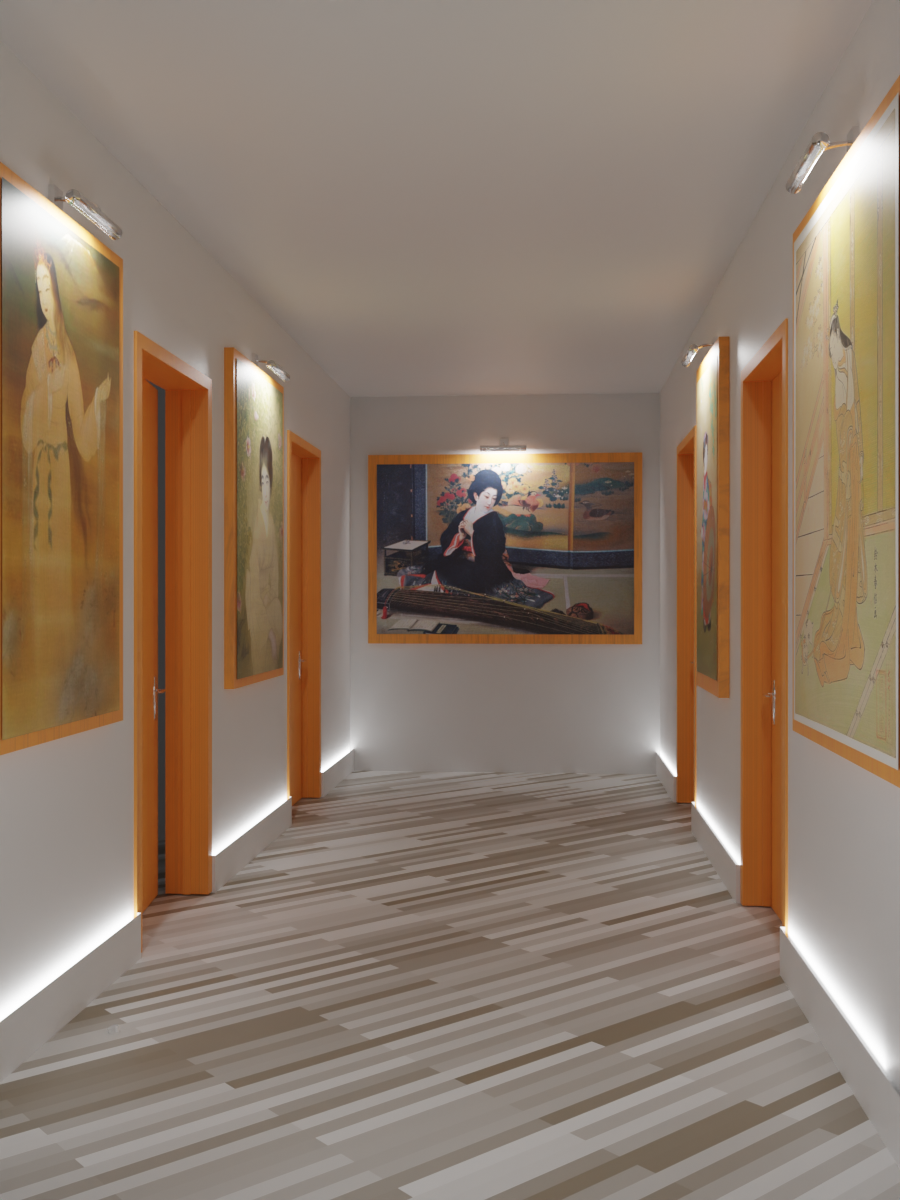
Hallway designed as an art gallery with accent lighting on the artworks, and floor trim with integrated linear light sources

Accent lighting focuses light on a particular area or object. It is often used to highlight art or other artifacts. Common types of light fixtures used for accent lighting include wall sconces, floodlights, recessed lights, torchère lamps, or track lighting. The brighter light from the accent lamp creates visual interest to a room.

== Overview ==
When highlighting artwork with picture lights, this type of lighting should be positioned above or just in front of the piece to cast an even glow across the surface, enhancing colors and details without creating glare. Accent lights may also be used in practical applications to shine light on a stairway, such as in movie theaters, or to light walkways.

Some accent lights are not made to shine on a particular object, but are themselves a piece of art with a self-contained light source. Often made with Tiffany glass, these serve as a piece of functional decor for a home.

Accent lights can also be used outdoors as guides for pathways or to spotlight garden art.

== Gallery ==
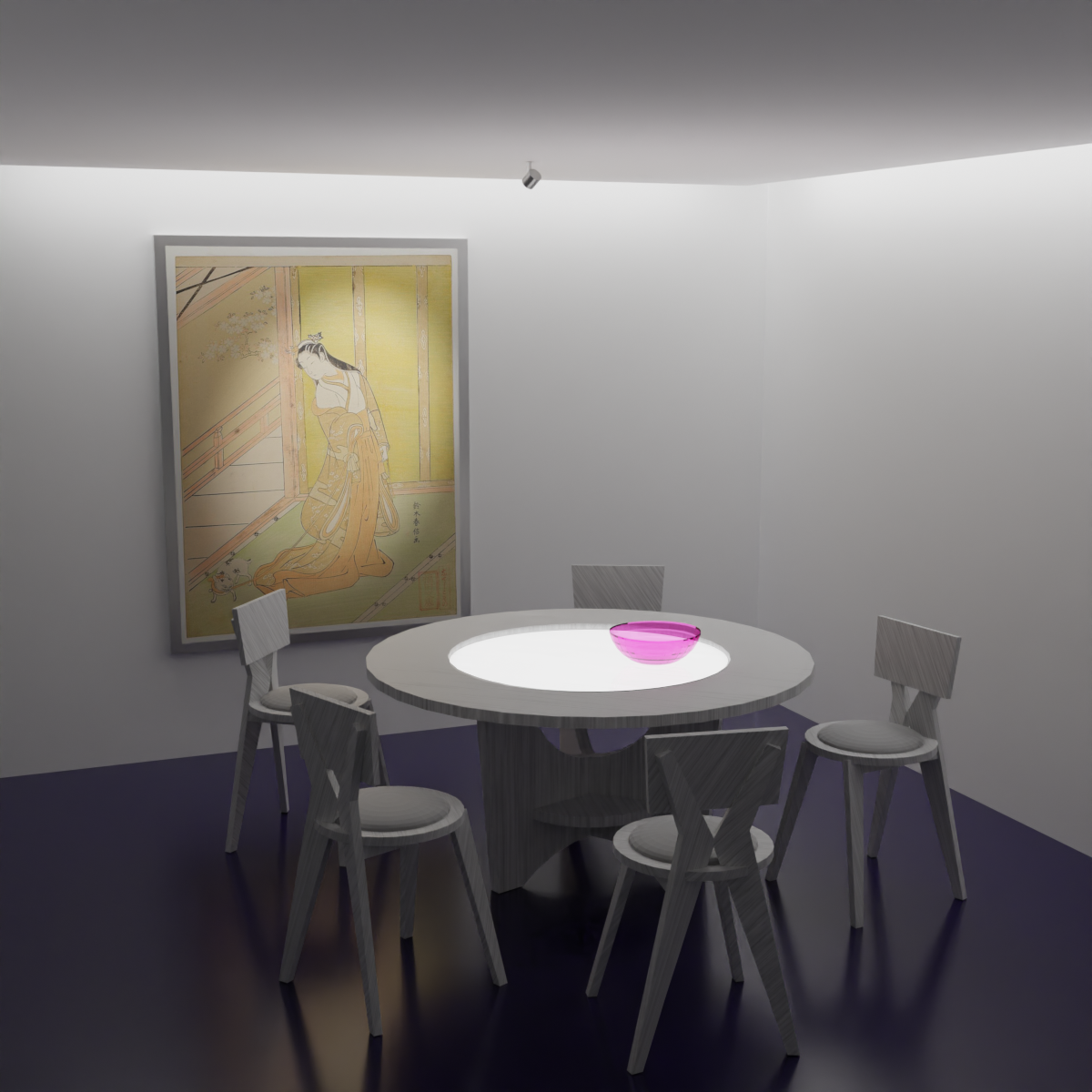
A tabletop with integrated lighting creates a visual accent, but does not illuminate what is on the plates

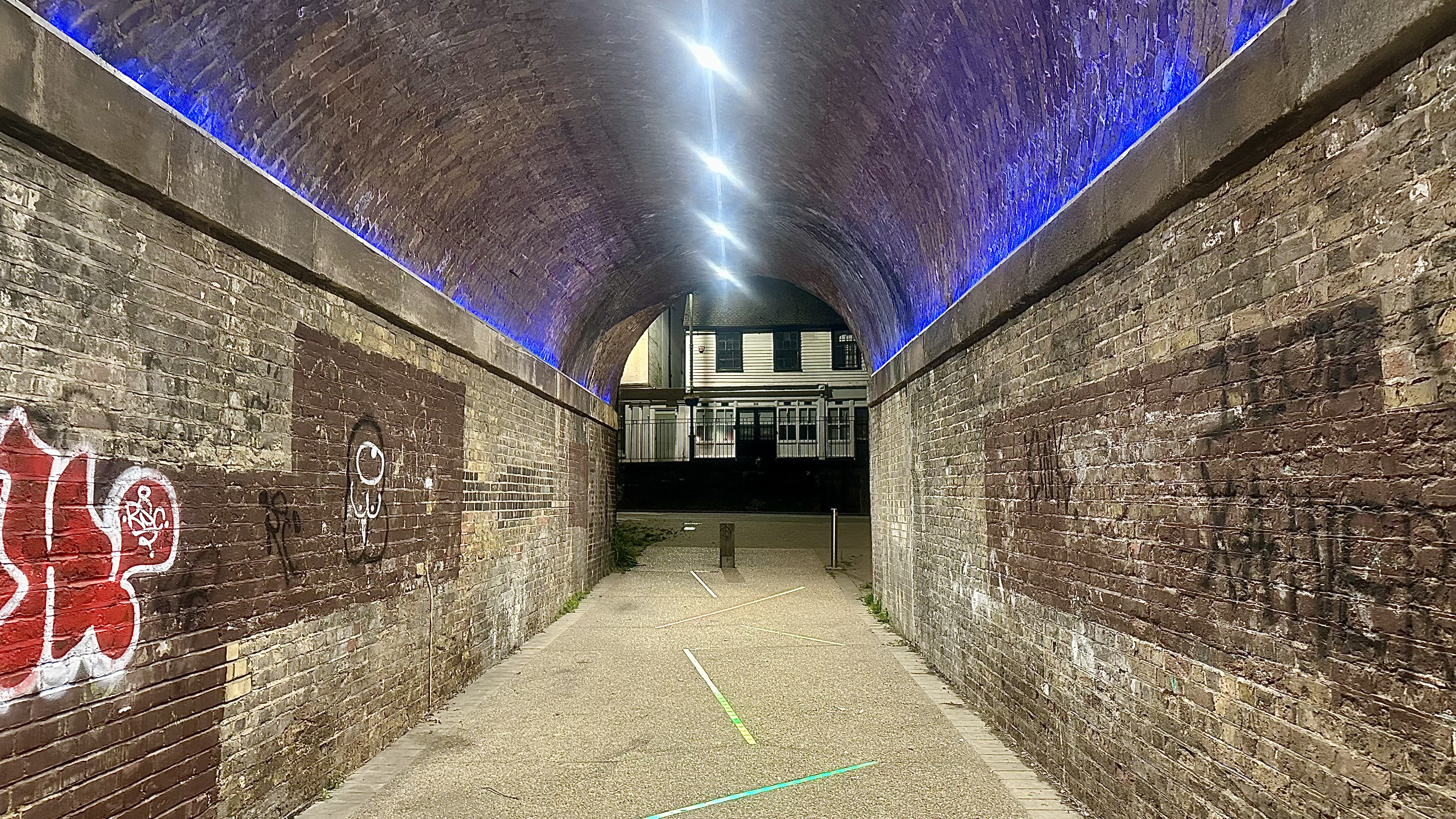
Pedestrian railway arch tunnel with blue and green strip lighting accents.
