= Wall washer =

- Wall washer, Anchor plate on walls of buildings
- Wallwasher, a lighting device to illuminate a wall
