= Hydrargyrum quartz iodide =

Hydrargyrum quartz iodide (HQI) is a trademark name of Osram's brand of metal halide lamps made for general floodlighting, arena floodlighting, shop and commercial and industrial lighting. Hydrargyrum is the Latin name for the element mercury. When heated, mercury vapour is created inside the lamp, and deposited when it cools.

An HQI lamp consists of a protective outer glass shield surrounding two heavy wires which are inserted into each end of a smaller inner quartz arctube containing argon, mercury and metal halides. The lamp is powered by an electrical ballast, which regulates the current flow through the arc in the arctube, and an ignitor, to make the high voltage pulse that is necessary to start the arc in the arctube. Like all HID lamps, HQI lamps operate under high pressure and temperature, and require special light fixtures for safe use.

HQI lamps can produce different color temperatures when manufactured with different metal halides. They are relatively efficient light sources producing a high lumen per watt ratio (approximately 6x that of incandescent lamps).

Like HMI, HQI lamps are a subset (or type) of metal halide lamps, which in turn are a subset of high-intensity discharge (HID) lamps. They should not be confused with halogen lamps, which are a specialized type of incandescent lamp.
