= Lightolier =

- Company type: Division of Royal Philips Electronics
- Industry: Lighting Manufacturers
- Founded: 1904
- Headquarters: Fall River, Massachusetts, United States of America
- Key people: Zia Eftekhar (CEO); William (Bill) Schoettler (President)
- Products: Commercial Lighting, Residential Lighting, Outdoor Lighting, etc.
- Revenue: ▲ approx. $500 million (2006)
- Website: www.Lightolier.com

Lightolier is a company that manufactures and sells a wide array of lighting fixtures. It was founded in 1904 by Bernhard Blitzer under the name of New York Gas and Appliance Co. When electric lighting started to be more widely accepted, the name was changed to Lightolier, a contraction of the words light and chandelier. In 2007, Philips Royal Electronics announced that it would acquire the Genlyte Group which would make Lightolier a part of Philips.

In its early years, the company specialized in fancy decorative chandeliers, then made a shift to the high-end design and architectural markets in the 1920s. In the 1960s Lightolier introduced the first track lighting system, designed by the late Anthony C. Donato (a vertically integrated track, unlike the horizontal tracks of today). During this same period Lightolier began importing European designs, including that of Gaetano Sciolari. Also notable is the success of the Lytegem series, designed by Michael Lax, that has a place in the permanent collection of the Museum of Modern Art. Lightolier is also known for its advanced reflector designs, and was the first lighting company to introduce digital lighting systems in the early 1990s. The company is also Sustaining Member of the Illuminating Engineering Society of North America, a founding member of the American Lighting Association, an ally of the EPA Green Lights program, and a Partner of the Lighting Research Center.

The company currently has manufacturing operations in:

- Fall River, MA (Track and Recessed Downlights, also Corporate Headquarters)(closed Down)
- Wilmington, MA (Fluorescent fixtures) (Closed as of November, 2012)
- Edison, NJ (Downlights/Distribution)
- Fontana, CA (Fluorescent and Recessed Linear fixtures)
- Camargo, Mexico (Track and Recessed Downlights)

And Distribution Centers in:

- Norwich, CT
- Atlanta, GA
- Elgin, IL
- Carrollton, TX
- Compton, CA

== Divisions of Lightolier ==
- Translite Sonoma - maker of decorative lighting fixtures.
- Exceline - maker of decorative glass and metal lighting fixtures.
- Ardee Lighting - maker of architectural accent lighting fixtures.
