= Gaetano Sciolari =

Angelo Gaetano Sciolari (1927-1994) was the owner of Sciolari Lighting and designer for the Italian manufacturer Stilnovo in the 1950s. It was while working for Stilnovo that Sciolari "created his most recognizable and celebrated designs, a series of multi-light chandeliers fashioned with both glossy and matte metal, conjuring up futuristic visions of the dawning space age." Throughout the 1960s, 70s, and 80s his designs were in demand, with his designs imported to the American market by Lightolier & Progress Lighting. During this same period, his designs appeared prominently in popular television and film due to their luxurious and futuristic appearance. He gave up working in film to pursue architecture.
