= Genlyte Group =

Holding company Bairnco formed the Genlyte Group from nine lighting companies in 1984. The Genlyte Group formed a joint venture with Thomas Industries in 1998. Genlyte Group brands at the time included Bronzelite, Canlyte, Crescent, DiamondF, ExceLine, Forecast, Hadco, Lightolier, Stonco, and Wide-Lite. Thomas Industries brands included Capri, Day-Brite, Emco, Gardco, Lumec, mcPhilben, Omega, and Thomas. Additional brands appeared, and in some cases later disappeared, from the Genlyte Thomas website as follows:

- Horizon, Lite-Energy, Matrix, and Zed were already listed as of November 1999.
- DiamondF was not listed there, and its own website had gone offline by December 1998.
- Ledalite was acquired in 1999.
- Translite Sonoma was acquired in 2000.
- Chloride Systems and LightGuard were acquired from the Chloride Group in 2000.
- Fibre Light was listed in 2001 following a joint venture announced in 1999. It had been removed from the list by April 2004, and its own U.S. website went offline earlier that year.
- Entertainment Technology was acquired from Rosco Laboratories in 2001.
- Vari-Lite was acquired in 2002.
- Shakespeare Composite Structures was acquired in 2003.
- USS Manufacturing was acquired in 2004.

The Genlyte Group reached an agreement with Thomas Industries in 2004 to acquire its 32% minority interest in Genlyte Thomas. The Genlyte Group (now including Genlyte Thomas brands) acquired the JJI Lighting Group in 2006, thereby adding the following brands: Alkco, Allscape, Ardee, d’ac, Guth, High-Lites, Hoffmeister Leuchten, LAM, Metrolux, Morlite, Nessen, Quality, Specialty, and Vista. It also acquired Strand Lighting in 2006, followed by Hanover Lantern in 2007.

The Genlyte Group was acquired by Philips in 2008, and became part of the Philips Lighting Business Unit Professional Luminaires North America. Philips Lighting N.V. included Genlyte brands when it was created in 2016, and the spinoff was renamed Signify N.V. in 2018.

The name was brought back as Genlyte Solutions by Signify in 2020 to cover a subset of its brands. Genlyte Solutions brands include Advance, Alkco, Bodine, Chloride, Color Kinetics, Day-Brite CFI, Dynalite, Gardco, Hadco, Interact, Ledalite, Lightolier, Lumec, Philips, and Stonco Keene.
