= Task lighting =

Increasing illuminance to better accomplish a specific activity

Often task lighting refers to increasing illuminance to better accomplish a specific activity. However, the illuminance level is not the only factor governing visibility. Contrast is also important, and a poorly positioned light source may cause contrast reduction, resulting in loss of visibility. The most important purpose of task lighting in the office is not increasing illuminance, but improving contrast. General lighting can be reduced because task lighting provides focused light where needed.

Different strategies for task lighting exist. The three main approaches are:

- Localized average lighting, where a lamp supplies both ambient light and task light
- Freely adjustable task light such as a gooseneck, balanced-arm lamp, or swing-arm light.
- Asymmetric task light, where the lamp is placed at the side of the work area

There are also other approaches to task lighting, for example under-shelf luminaires.

Other instances of task lighting are in machinery, where a specific work area needs illumination, and in workshops, where a task light may illuminate the actual working area. Special instances of task lighting are examination and operation lights for medicine and surgery, as well as the dentist's lamp. Task lamps are also used for many home tasks such as sewing, reading, small repairs, model construction, crafts, writing, and many other activities. The actual task may range from very small up to about as far as you may reach with your hands or available tools. Lighting of larger areas is beyond the scope of task lighting.

== Task lighting ==
=== Localized average lighting ===
Localized lighting consists of a luminaire that provides ambient light as well as task light. Often it is an uplighter with a light source that is directed downward. It is intended to be mounted immediately over the workplace, and it can be either hung from the ceiling, mounted on the desk or a dividing wall, or it can be a free-standing floor lamp. Recessed lights placed directly over the work area are another common example.

=== Fixed task lighting ===
Fixed task lighting refers to a non-movable light source dedicated to lighting a specific task. In kitchens, a homeowner may install several recessed "can" lights or under cabinet lighting to provide clear lighting onto the counters for cutting and preparing food. Having proper lighting when working with sharp knives is a critical component of injury prevention. Another form of fixed task lighting may simply be a table lamp positioned over one's reading chair.

=== Freely adjustable task lights ===
The main feature of the freely adjustable task light is evident; one may adjust it freely at any whim or to suit one's needs. The lamp presents few limits to how one may position or orient the light. A freely adjustable lamp may include means for glare control, as a honeycomb or parabolic louvre that restricts the light output angle.

A common form of home task lighting is a goose-neck lamp or swing arm light fixture. The adjustable neck allows light to be focused on the exact task needed, and the swing-arm wall sconces can be positioned next to a bed or chair, and adjusted to shine light on a printed page. Free standing, adjustable desk lamps are commonly used in home office applications.

=== Magnifying task lights ===
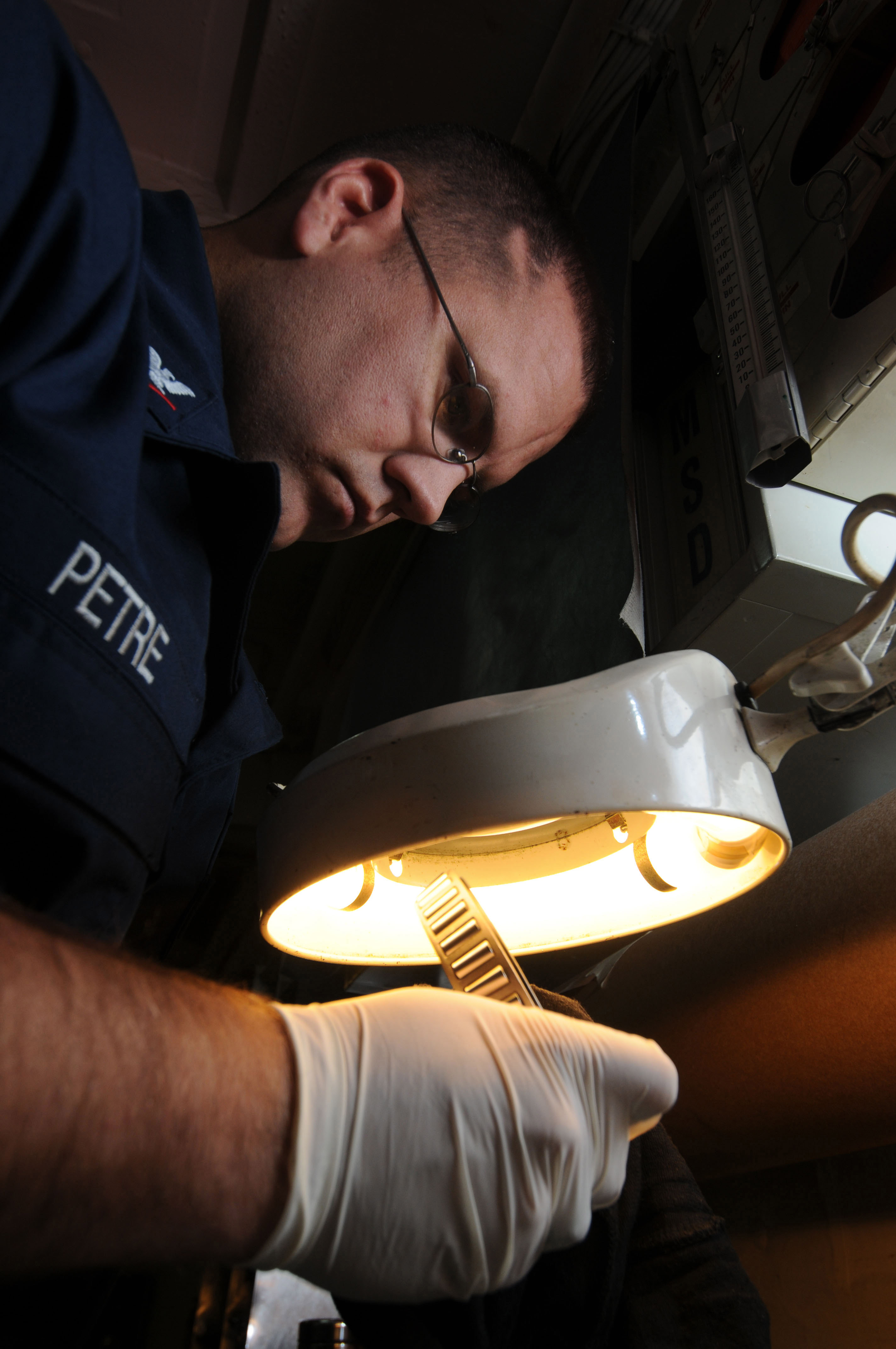
Illuminating magnifier

Some task lights also come with built in magnifying glasses for detailed tasks. It is hard to overstate the benefits of having focused light alongside magnification for small, precise operations such as model building, sewing, or other high-detail activities. Dentists often use a task light with magnification to perform dental cleanings.

=== Asymmetric task lighting ===
The asymmetric task light is intended to be placed at the side of the actual task. The luminaire directs the light obliquely over the desk, with the highest illuminance typically about 1' to 1½' to the side of the lamp head. It mostly has an arm system that holds the lamp head horizontally irrespective of the arm movement - a parallel arm. Asymmetric lamps often cause more reflected glare than other lamps. In workplaces where people use different table heights, an asymmetric lamp may cause direct glare due to its absence of means for glare control (ref:1).

== Home task lighting ==
Task lighting can also be applied to home uses. Many people benefit from dedicated lighting for specific tasks such as cooking, sewing, reading, or paperwork. Home task lighting can be found in fixed or adjustable forms.

== Contrast reduction ==
Contrast reduction in the office workplace refers to reading objects having decreased contrast compared to an estimated ideal contrast. If a lamp is placed so that printed letters reflect some of the light, their contrast against the paper background will decrease. This happens when a light source is reflected as in a mirror from the print into the eyes of the observer. A poorly placed lamp may render text illegible, regardless of illuminance level. For older persons, increased lighting and contrast is a necessary aid to performing daily tasks such as paying bills or reading.
