= Michael Lax =

American industrial designer (1929–1999)

Michael Lax (1929–1999) was an American industrial designer who created household products for companies such as Copco, Lightolier, Dansk, Salton, Metaal, Mikasa, Tupperware, and American Cyanamid. Several of his best-known products, including the Lytegem lamp by Lightolier and the Copco enamel-coated teakettle with teak handle, are represented in permanent museum collections.

== Personal life ==
Lax was born on November 8, 1929, in New York City, New York. He grew up on Morton Street in the West Village and went to elementary school at PS 2. He graduated from the New York School of Music and Art in New York City (1947) and Alfred University's New York State College of Ceramics (1951). In 1950, he married Rosemary Raymond; they were divorced in 1978.

== Design career ==
In 1954, Lax went to Finland with his wife, Rosemary, and two-year-old daughter, Jennifer, on a Fulbright Fellowship, where he learned Scandinavian modern design. He was hired by Russel Wright, in 1956, to work on a series of dinnerware designs. Lax did freelance work until 1960 when he began to work on enameled cast iron cookware for Copco; this was his first break as a solo designer. Lax designed a line of cast-iron and porcelain enamel cookware for Copco including a 1962 enamel-coated teakettle with a bent teak handle which became one of his most recognizable pieces. More than one million of these teakettles were sold before it was discontinued in the 1980s. Other popular Copco pieces designed by Lax include a fondue pot, a casserole/paella pan, and a Dutch oven. These pieces are no longer manufactured and are considered collectable.

Another of Lax's well-known pieces was a low-voltage, high-intensity lamp that he designed for Lightolier in 1965. The lamp, named the Lytegem, had a minimalist design with a cube base and a ball reflector on a telescoping arm. Shortly after its release, the lamp had captured 10% of the market. It is now part of the permanent collection at the Museum of Modern Art (MOMA) in New York City.

Lax's other designs included "Cut Outs for Play", playground equipment designed for U.S. Plywood, a treehouse for adults, a yogurt maker for Salton, containers for Tupperware, glasses and tableware for Mikasa and Rosenthal, and an acrylic bathtub for American Cyanamid.

Lax was known to be a perfectionist with a hands-on approach to design. He made his own plaster casts for the designs that he created, and he traveled to countries where his products were being made to oversee production.

== Exhibits ==
Lax's work has been included in exhibits and permanent museum collections, including:

- Lytegem for Lightolier, 1965 - in the permanent design collection at MOMA
- Household air ionizer in the form of a simple black pyramid by Amcor, 1980 - in the permanent design collection at MOMA
- Copco fondue pot - Smithsonian American Art Museum
- Design Since 1945, 1983 - an exhibit at the Philadelphia Museum of Art

== Sculpture career ==
Later in his career, Lax became increasingly interested in sculpture. In 1977, he received a Rome Prize to study art at the American Academy in Rome. He returned to Italy in 1984 and opened a studio in Pietrasanta, Tuscany, where he worked on a series of architectural forms in marble and cast bronze. Some of these items were exhibited at the Wainscott Gallery, Wainscott, New York. A series of cast aluminum bowls that he designed for Metaal (by Grainware) were formed from the breasts of a series of bronze nudes that he had sculpted.

Lax died on May 25), (Note: The New York Times appended a correction to their obituary stating that the date of death had been mis-reported and should have been May 25; the Guardian gave the date as May 28.) 1999, in Bridgehampton, New York.
