= Yard light =

Outdoor light fixture

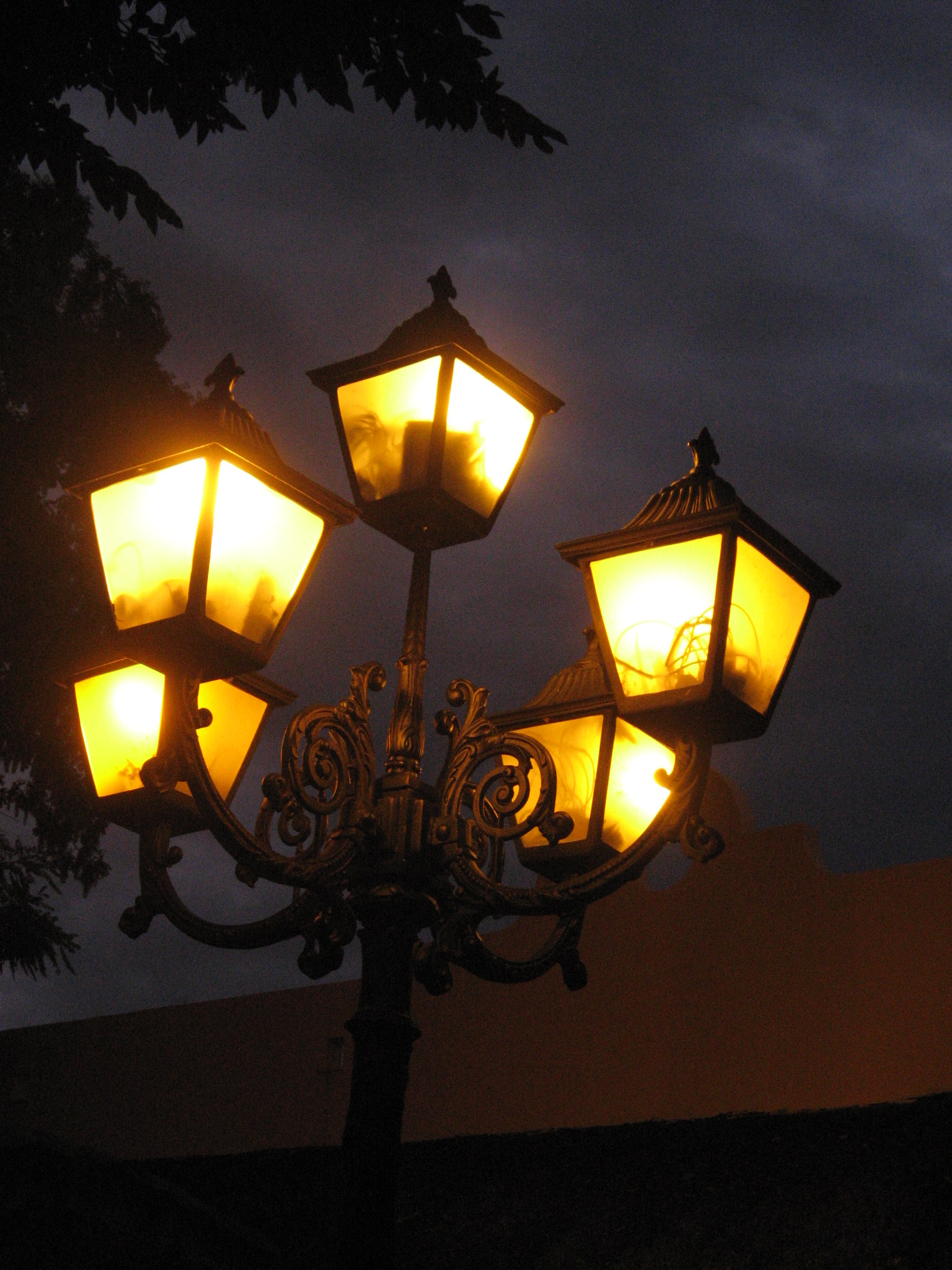
Yard light-garden lantern with multiple lamps.

A yard light or garden lantern is a free standing exterior light fixture in gardens and landscaped settings. They are usually illuminated by electricity, but occasionally natural gas, and are usually placed near an outdoor path or driveway to provide visibility in dark areas or areas that become dark at certain times. A solar lamp is operated by batteries charged by solar panels during the day.

Electric garden lanterns are usually controlled from inside a building by a wall switch, or by a photoelectric sensor attached to the lamp or nearby. Yard lamps intended to provide security lighting may be controlled by a motion sensor. Gas lanterns that burn continually may be prohibited by some jurisdiction's greenhouse gas environmental regulations.

Yard lamps are weather resistant. Water penetration can extinguish the flame, shatter the bulb, or short circuit the wiring.

Yard lights can have a detrimental impact on wildlife and contribute to light pollution.

== See also ==
- Landscape lighting
- Architectural lighting design
