= Carbon button lamp =

Single-electrode incandescent lamp

The carbon button lamp is a single-electrode incandescent lamp invented by Nikola Tesla in the 1890s. A carbon button lamp contains a small carbon sphere positioned in the center of an evacuated glass bulb. This type of lamp must be driven by high-frequency alternating current, and depends on an electric arc or perhaps a vacuum arc to produce high current around the carbon electrode. The carbon electrode is then heated to incandescence by collisions by ions, which constitute the electric current. Tesla found that these lamps could be used as powerful sources of ionizing radiation.

In February 1892, Tesla gave a lecture to the Institution of Electrical Engineers, in which he described the carbon button lamp in detail. He also described several variants of the lamp, one of which uses a ruby drop in place of the carbon button.

Tesla went on to develop it as a near commercial lighting product. Engineer George Egely has argued that the carbon button lamp "could have been a serious competitor for the incandescent tungsten filament bulbs and the later 'neon tubes' of gas discharge devices."

== See also ==
- List of light sources
