= Wallwasher =

Lighting technique

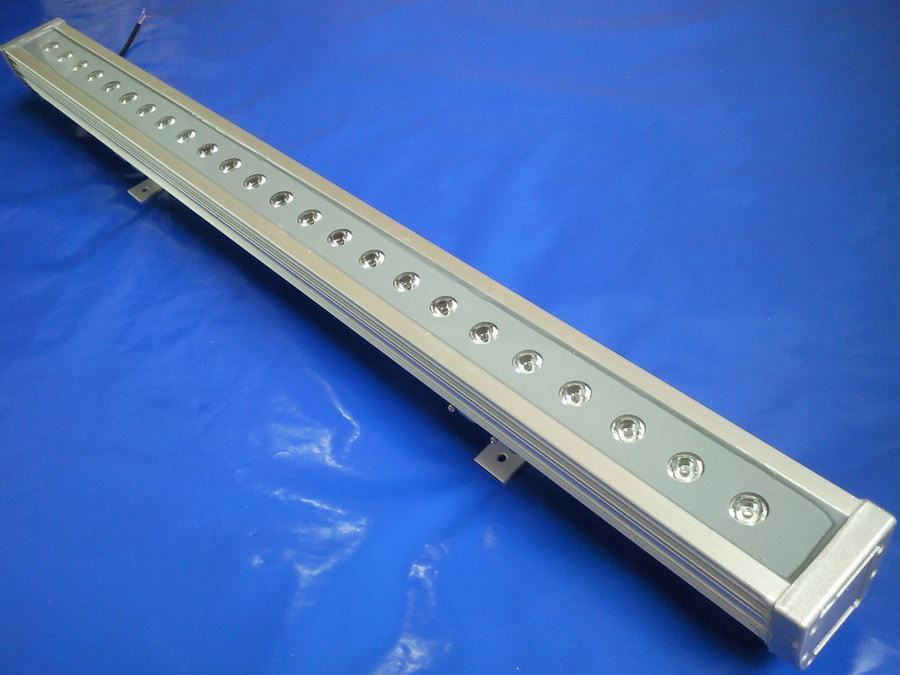
LED wallwasher 24 W

Wallwashing or vertical lighting is a lighting design technique for illumination of large surfaces. It is mainly used with contemporary architecture; in public cultural buildings, museums and galleries; and in landscape lighting.

Most of what one actually sees, entering a room, are the vertical surfaces. The illumination requires asymmetric lighting fixtures, which, in a number of 3 or more in a line, can produce evenly illuminated walls. It is a technique used mainly by lighting designers to create lighter spaces, or make rooms seem brighter or higher, similar to the "horizon" technique used in theatre lighting.

== See also ==
- Sconce (light fixture), a small wall-mounted lamp
