= Under-cabinet lighting =

Lighting under a cabinet, shelf, or similar cast on a work surface

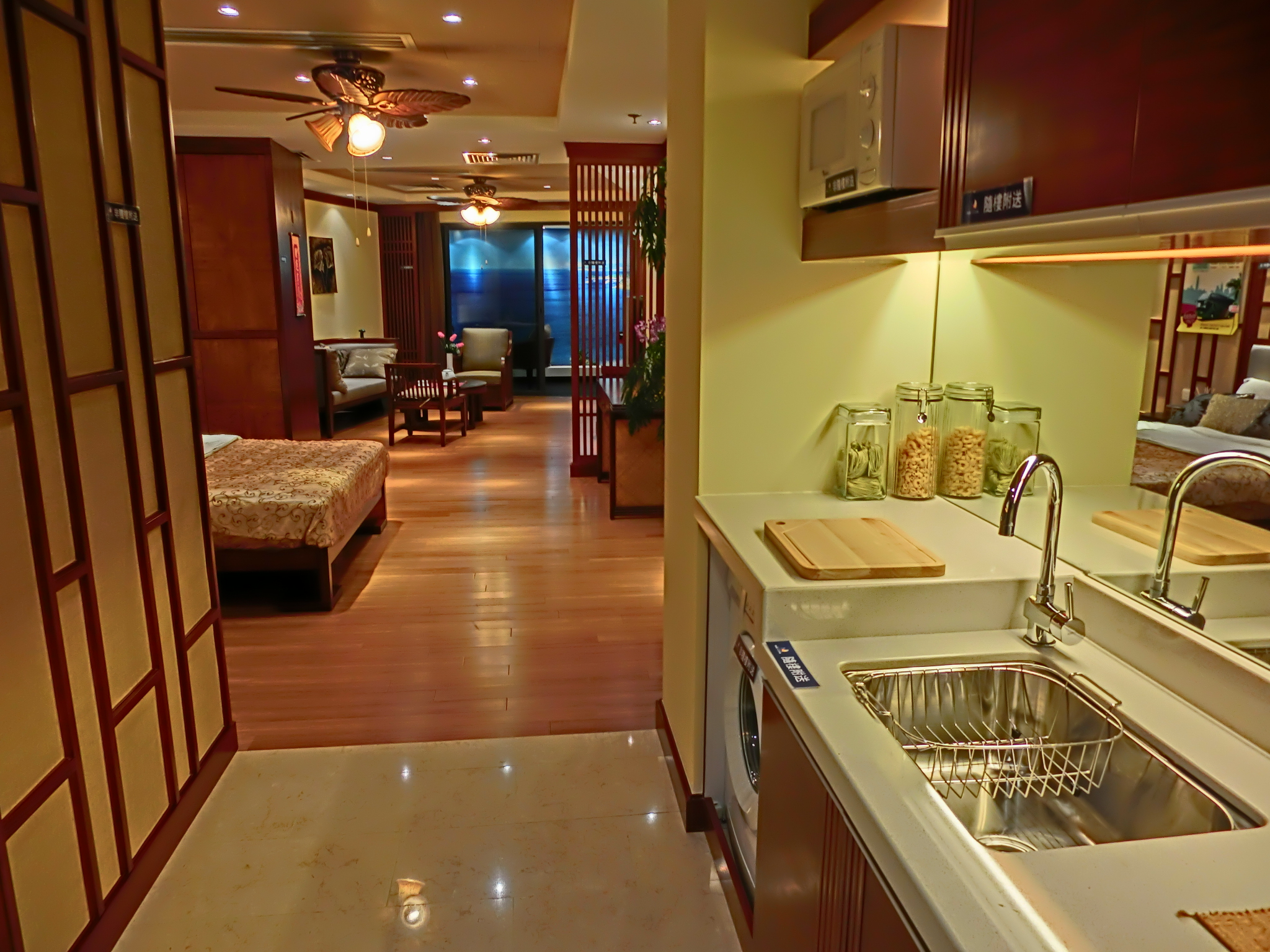
Kitchen with under-cabinet lighting (2013)

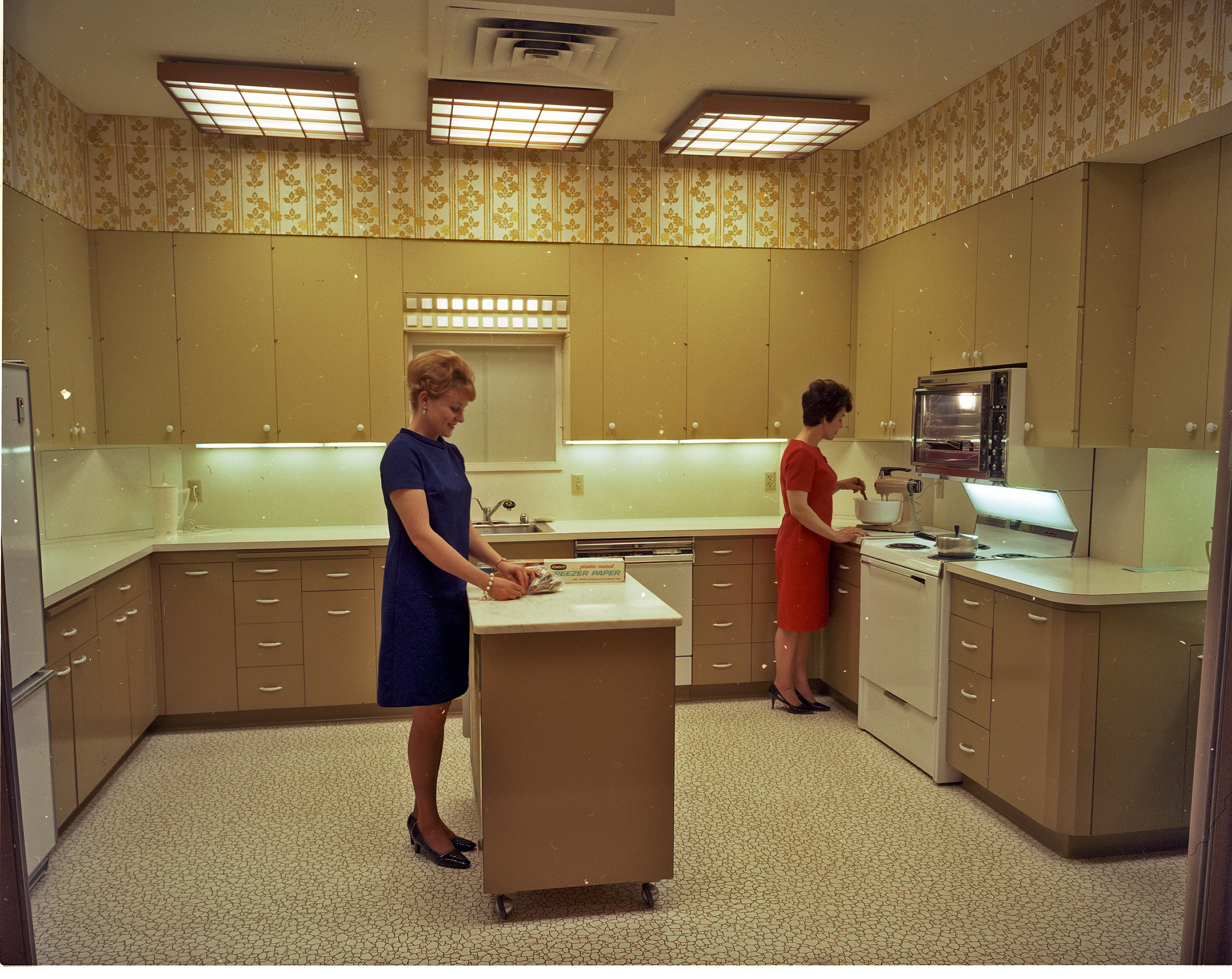
Kitchen with under-cabinet lighting (1968)

Under-cabinet lighting is typically added under a cabinet, shelf, or similar surface in order to produce localized lighting on a work surface. Under-cabinet lighting can also double as a night light.

== Types of under-cabinet lighting ==
There are three types of under-cabinet lighting available for residential use in the USA: incandescent, fluorescent, or LED. The type of lamp dictates the lamp’s style and performance, such as amount of lighting it emits, the light’s color, the life of the lamp, and energy use.

Incandescent lamps are easily found and are inexpensive to buy and are easy to replace. However, they have the shortest life and use the most energy.

Fluorescent lamps have good light color, color rendering, turn on instantly, and do not flicker. They have high efficacy, long life, and bright, uniform lighting, However, some fluorescent fixture designs are not small or narrow enough to be concealed without modifying cabinet trip molding.

LEDs can last longer than 10 years or up to 50,000 hours, and do not typically burn out. LEDs generate little heat but may be susceptible to high temperatures.

== Common styles ==
The two most common styles are puck and linear styles.

Puck lights are round or oval and are good for cabinet and display lighting. Puck lights can create scallops, spots, or pools of lighting instead of even illumination across the counter top.

Linear lights can come as a light strip or as a linear fixture or light bar. Linear fixtures resemble small puck lights on one mounting strip. Light strips are less than 25 mm wide are quite narrow. They are sold by the meter and can be cut to length during installation.

== Factors in selecting under-cabinet lighting ==
For wood tones, wood-colored tiles, copper-tones, or warm-toned walls, look for a light with correlated color temperature (CCTs) in the 2700-3500 K range. For glass tiles and shelves, look for CCTs in the 3500-5000K range. You should also look at the distance of the lighting requirement, where puck style better suits smaller width cabinets and linear styles suit longer width to maintain consistency and allow the lights to be linked together.

The Illuminating Engineering Society of North America recommends a light level of 500 lux for kitchen counters or critical tasks, such as cooking and chopping. Also consider the amount of lumens, the measure of the total quantity of visible light emitted. A high lumen output creates brighter whites and darker darks.
