= Track lighting =

Light fixtures attached anywhere on a continuous track

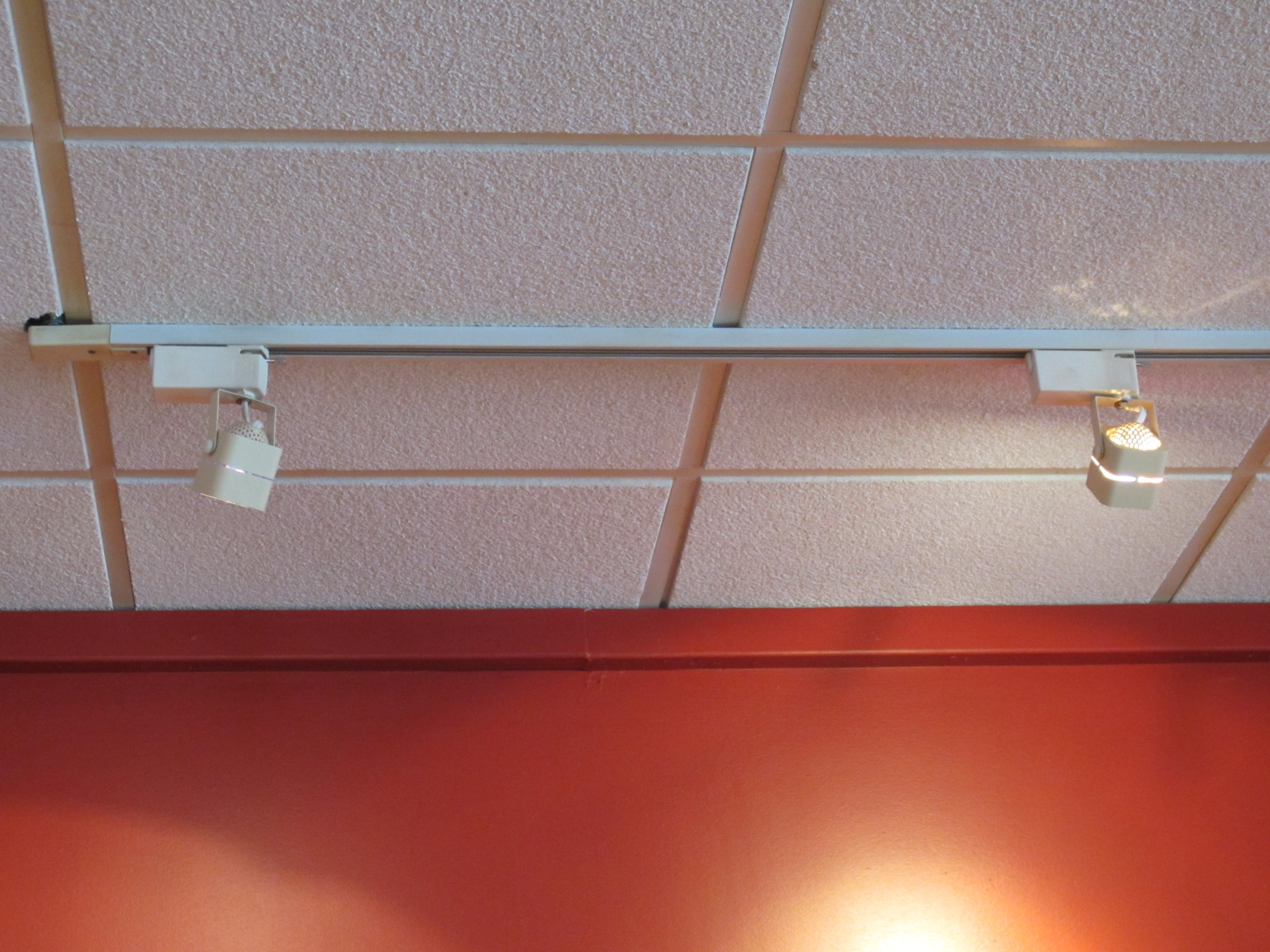
One style of track lighting with two lamps that can be aimed.

Track lighting is a method of lighting where light fixtures are attached anywhere on a continuous track device which contains electrical conductors. This is in contrast to directly routing electrical wiring to individual light positions. Tracks can either be mounted to ceilings or walls, lengthwise down beams, or across rafters or joists. They can also be hung with rods from especially high places like vaulted ceilings.

Track lighting was invented by Anthony Donato of Lightolier. Donato received the first patent related to track lighting in 1961.

== Tracks ==
There are multiple types of tracks used worldwide, for example:

- ERCO
- Eutrac
- GLOBAL Trac
- Halo
- Ivela
- Juno
- Lightolier

Typical systems have line voltage running through a recessed track. The track may have more than one live conductor, so that multiple switched circuits can be used to control different fittings on the same track. Installers will place the tab of the connector on the fixture to one side or the other when attaching it to the track.

Many systems now use a single live wire and then use digital control interfaces such as DALI to control the fittings. This means that each fitting can be independently controlled even with a single live conductor.

== Lamps ==
Track lighting is usually combined with directional lamps with reflectors, such as spotlights. These lamps can run under either mains voltage or a lower (often 12 V) voltage.

It is common to see line-voltage tracks with low-voltage fixtures. For these, each fixture requires a small built-in transformer to operate it. Alternatively, more modern systems are available with low voltage (10, 12, or 24 volts) running through the track, which is in itself decorative. In this case, the fixture may clamp onto a track made of two metal strips separated with an insulating strip. Two-circuit configurations are rare in such systems. The track is powered by a transformer which converts the high voltage into low voltage. There are magnetic and electronic transformers.

For all low-voltage fixtures or systems a special dimmer (if used) is required, as standard dimmers cause flickering because of the interaction with the transformers' load characteristics: magnetic transformers are inductive, while electronic ones are capacitive. The dimmers control the mains input to the transformers.

== Variations ==
Cable lighting is a variation where the fixtures are hung from uninsulated cables which carry low voltage. These fixtures range from the very simple, such as two hinged rods from which a halogen lamp hangs, to the very artful, such as a human silhouette whose feet touch the wires and hands hold the bulb or its socket. Two sets of cables (such as in the corner of a room where two walls meet) can be connected together with short wires that have clips (such as alligator clips or screw clamps) at either end.

Another variation is called flex track or monorail track lighting in which the fixtures are hung from a single line monorail track attached to the ceiling using stems. There are several different types of track. Some are very flexible and can be curved in any shape or form and some are more rigid and can be curved very slightly. Some patterns that can be made are "S curves" or "spirals". Various adapters are available for combining features of track and other lighting. There are "L" and "T" adapters for rigid track, as well as flexible ones for unusual angles, or to change the vertical angle where a ceiling changes slope. Adapter plates allow single fixtures to be attached directly to a junction box, by providing an extremely small section of track embedded into the plate. There are also arms which have the same feature, allowing fixtures to be mounted onto the same wall they shine onto, and having an attached power cord and wall plug.

If the track is properly anchored, a hanging fixture may be suspended from it. The track itself can also be suspended. Rather than being hard-wired to a junction box (which requires a feeder device to be snapped into the track, either in the middle or at one end), it can also be end-fed from a standard wall outlet. Outlets can also be snapped into line-voltage track.

== Gallery ==
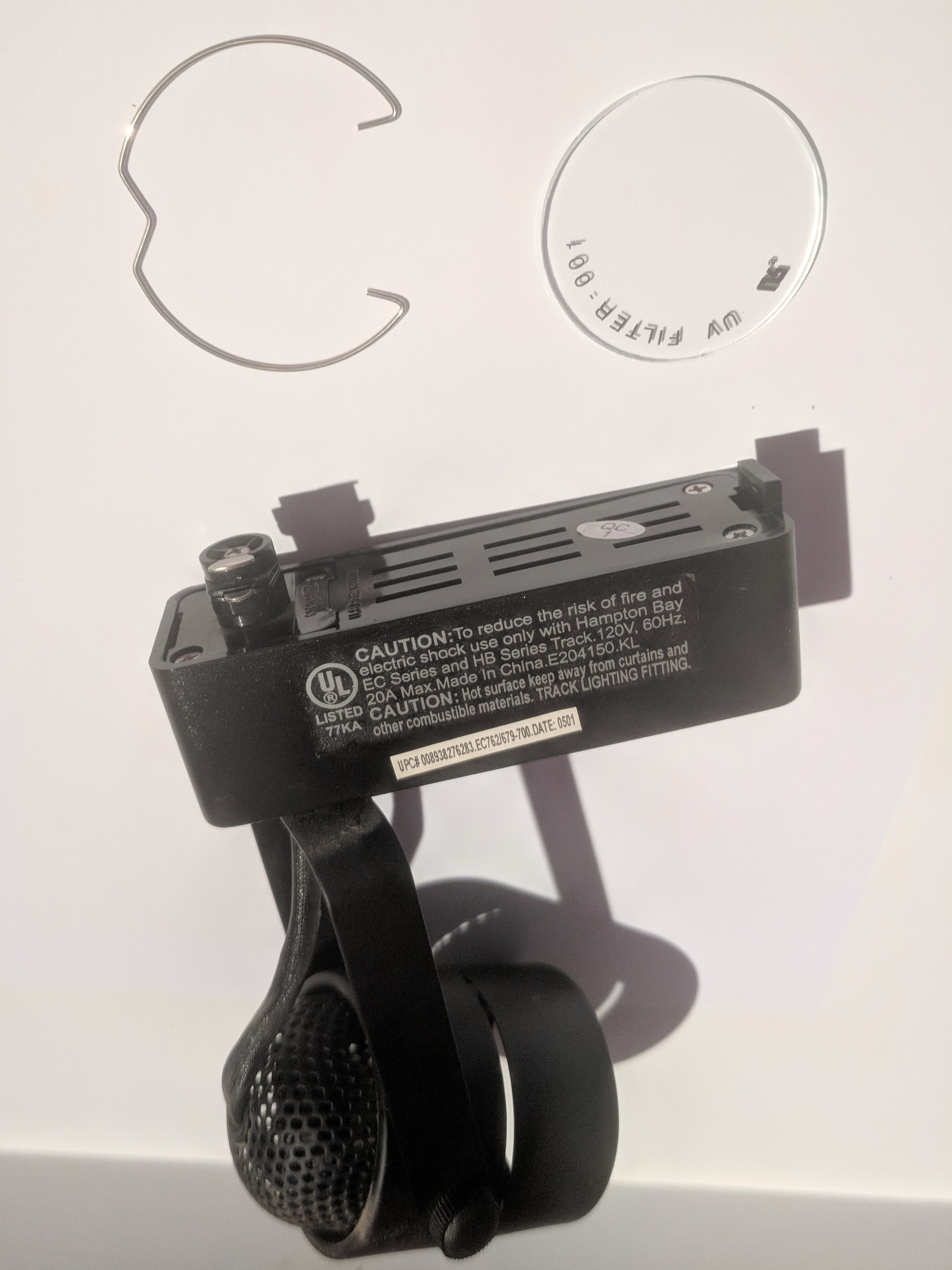
An H-track fixture head with integrated transformer, showing 2 of the 3 contacts on the same side. Model No. Hampton Bay EC762.

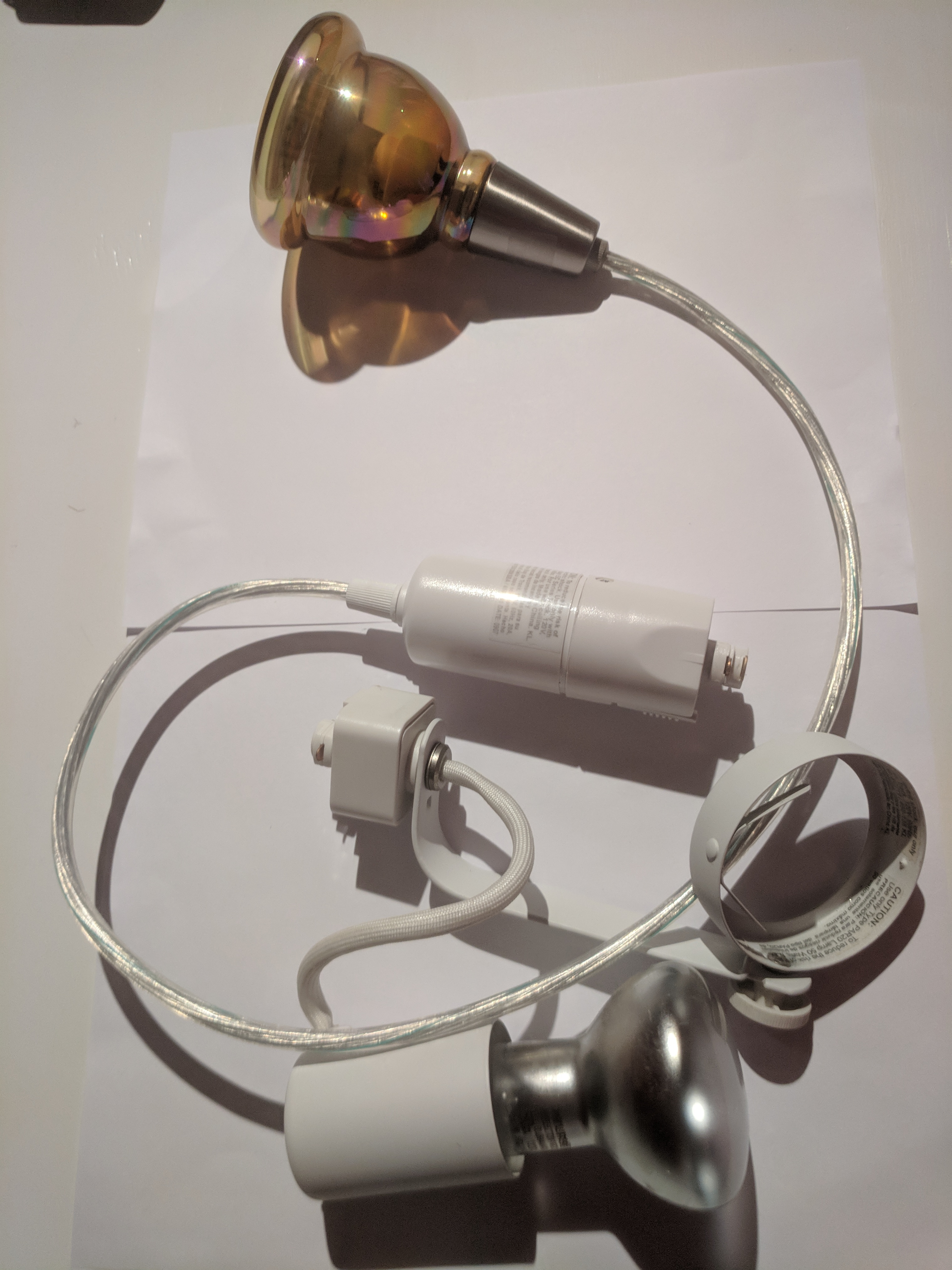
Two H-track fixtures for mains-voltage light bulbs, by Hampton Bay. Model No. EC719 (white, E26/[PA]R20) ES0208SBA (brown, GU10/MR16).

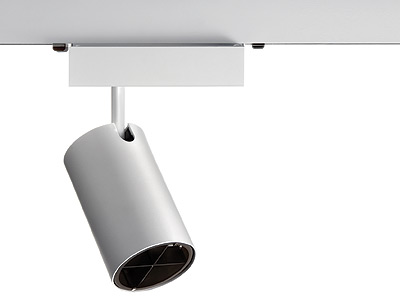
EPL Minimax O LED track fixture, with cross-baffle visible.
