= Sconce (light fixture) =

Type of light fixture

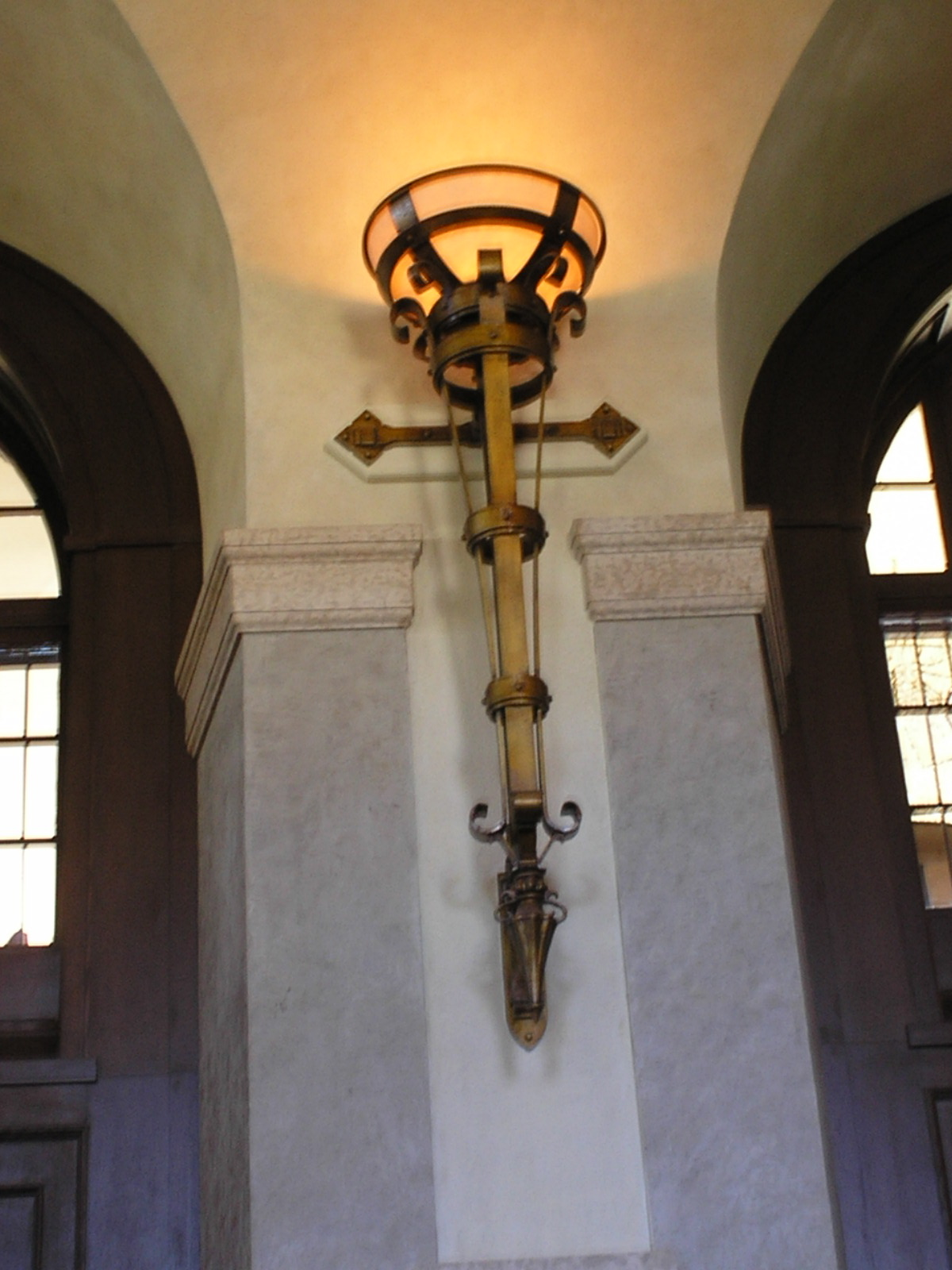
An electric sconce in the lobby of a luxury hotel

A sconce or wall light is a decorative light fixture that is mounted to a wall. The sconce is a very old form of fixture, historically used with candles and oil lamps.

They can provide general room lighting, and are common in hallways and corridors, but they may be mostly decorative. A sconce may be a traditional torch, cresset, candle or gaslight, or a modern electric light source affixed in the same way.

== Usage and history ==
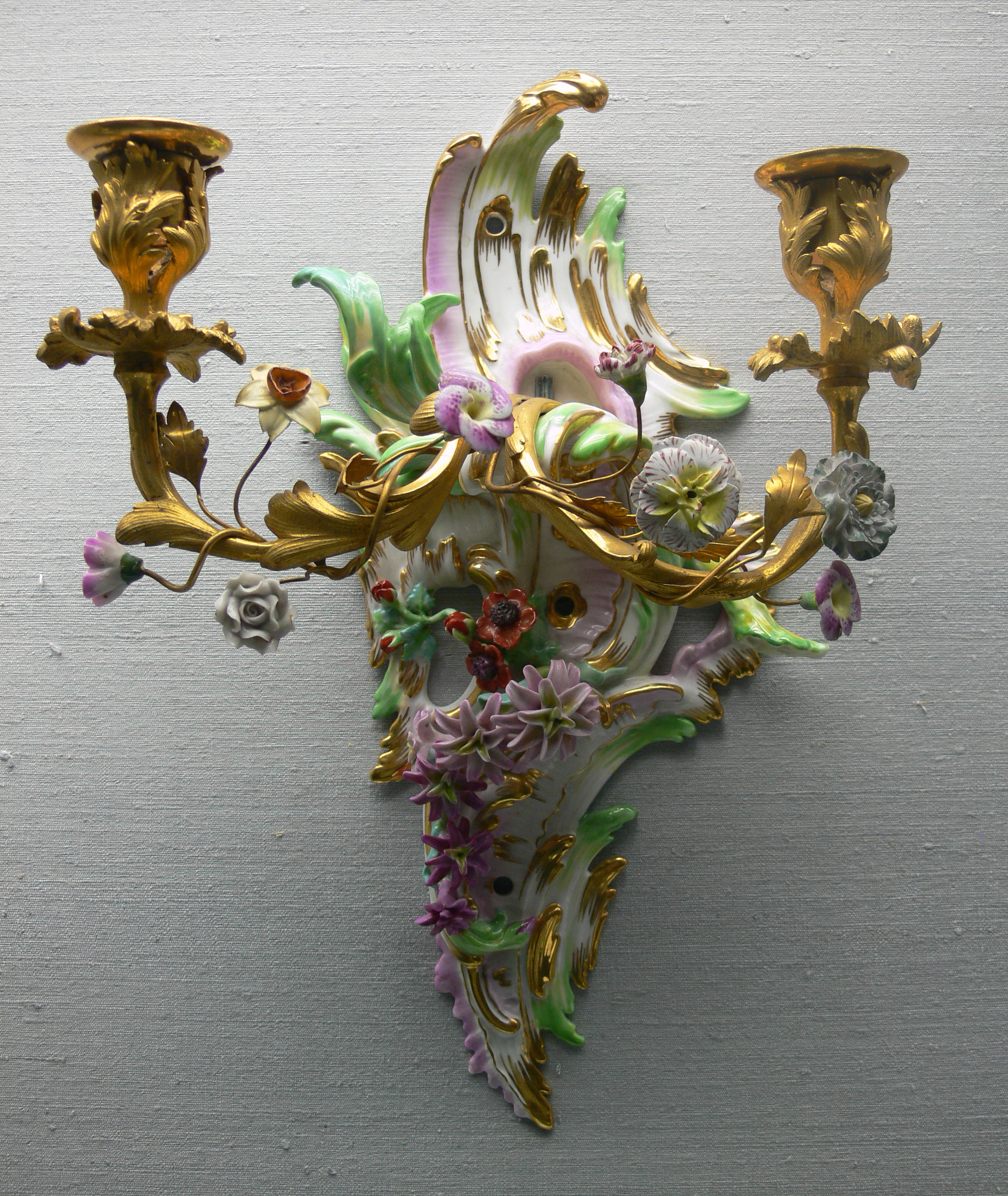
Porcelain and ormolu sconce for candles, Royal Porcelain Factory, Berlin, 1770

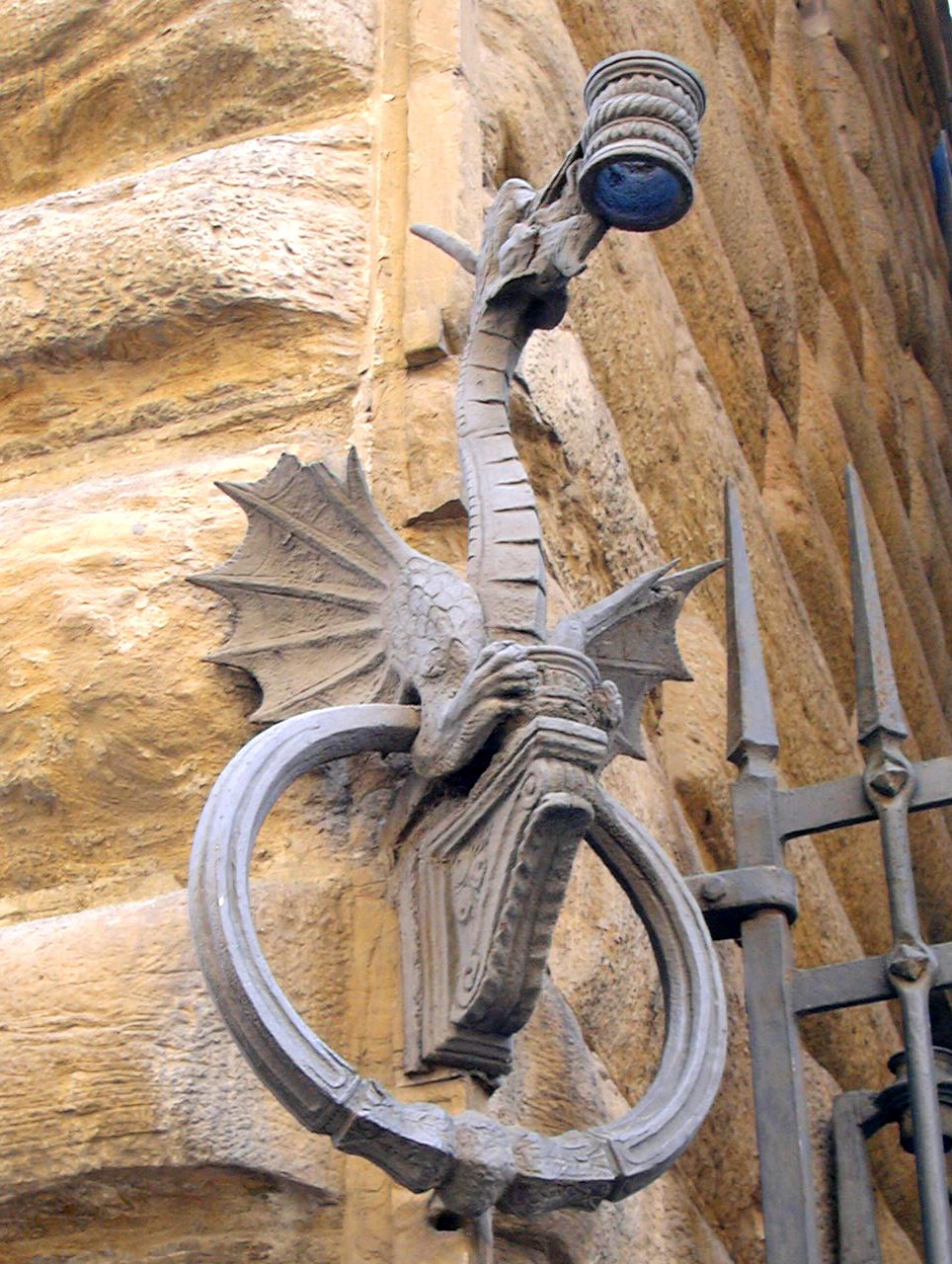
Sconce for holding a torch on the walls of the Medici palace, Florence, Italy

Sconces can be placed on both the interior and exterior walls of buildings. The light is usually, but not always, directed upwards and outwards, rather than down. In pre-modern usage, these usually held candles or gas flame, and torches respectively. Historically, candle sconces were often made of silver or brass from the 17th century, with porcelain and ormolu coming into use during the 18th century. The light of the candle flame was often intensified by a reflecting backplate. Using brackets, the candle or gas flame would be kept at safe distance from the wall and ceiling.

Modern electric light fixture sconces are often used in hallways or corridors to provide both lighting and a point of interest in a long passage. Sconce height in a passageway is generally 3/4 of the distance up the wall as measured from the floor to the ceiling, and the distance between sconces on the wall is generally equal to the distance of the sconces from the floor, often alternating sides of the passageway.

Sconces are typically installed in pairs or other multiple units to provide balance. They can be used to frame doorways or line a hallway. Swing-arm sconces are often placed next to a bed to provide task lighting for reading.
