= Recessed light =

Lighting fixture set into a ceiling or similar overhead surface

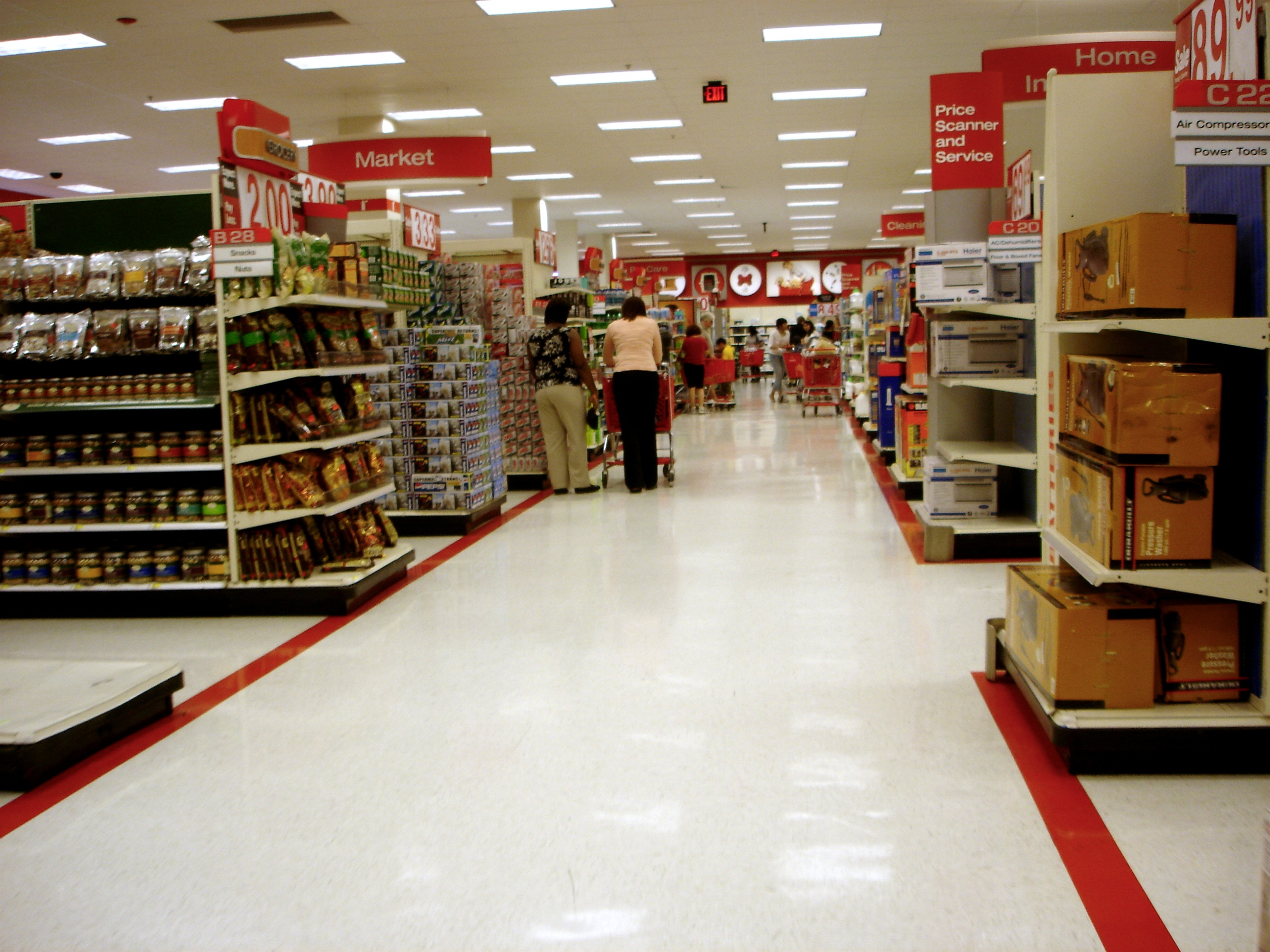
The interior of a Target store

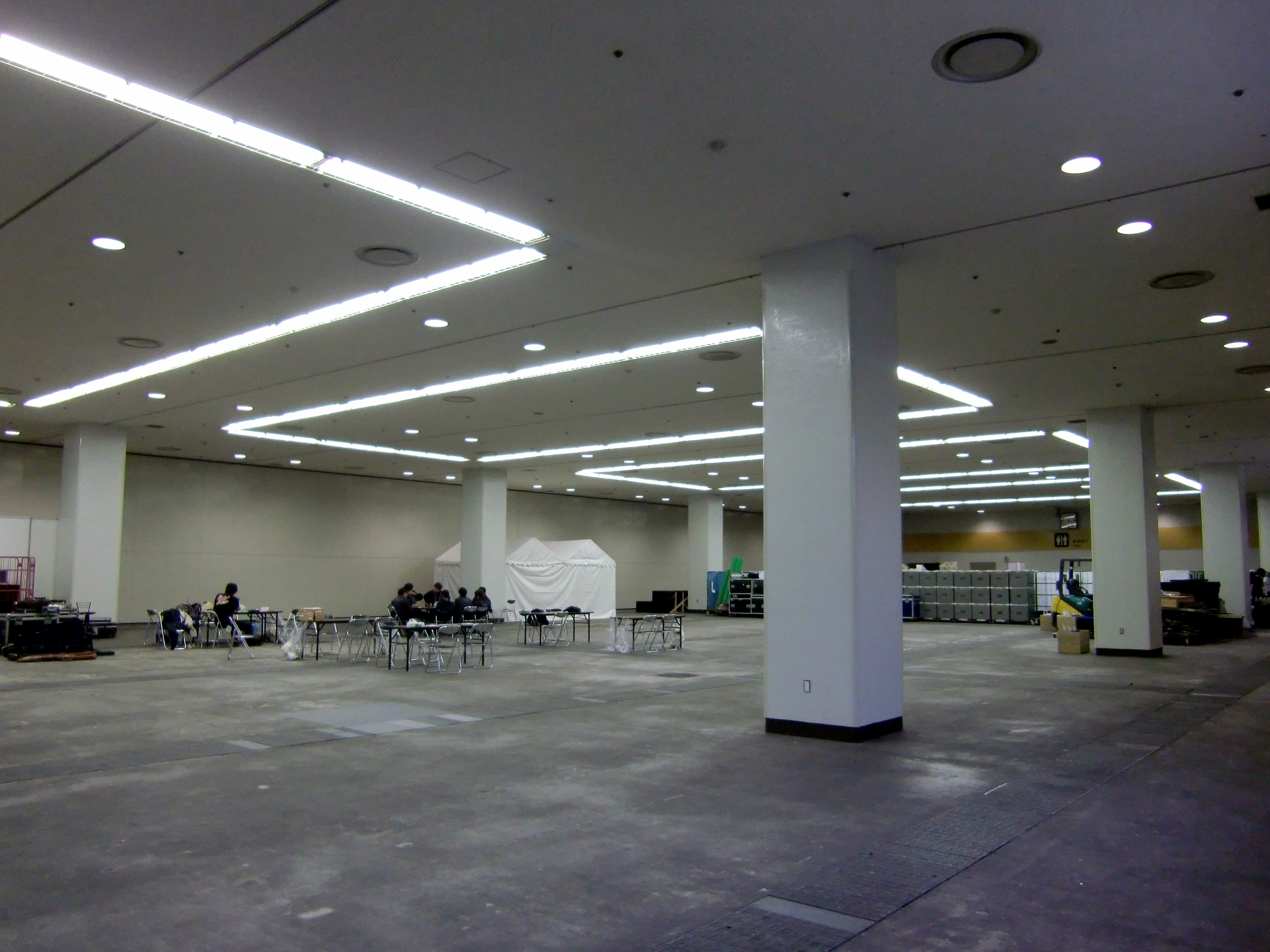
Different types of recessed lighting in a warehouse

A recessed light or downlight (also pot light in Canadian English, sometimes can light (for canister light) in American English) is a light fixture that is installed into a hollow opening in a ceiling. When installed it appears to have light shining from a hole in the ceiling, concentrating the light in a downward direction as a broad floodlight or narrow spotlight. Most recessed fixtures are cylindrical and fit into a circular hole in the ceiling.

There are three parts to a traditional recessed lighting fixture: housing, trim and bulb. The trim is the visible portion of the light. It is the insert that is seen when looking up into the fixture, and also includes the thin lining around the edge of the light. The housing is the fixture itself that is installed inside the ceiling and contains the lamp holder. There are many different types of bulbs that can be inserted into recessed lighting fixtures, with the amount of heat generated by the bulb being an important consideration.

Canless recessed lights, also known as "wafer lights" are thin one-piece assemblies with a built-in LED light source. These are inserted into a hole in the ceiling like traditional recessed lighting, but do not require as much space above the ceiling.

== History ==
The earliest recessed lights were developed in the 1940s by Ivan Kirlin of the Kirlin Company, Detroit, Michigan.

== Advantages ==
Recessed lighting offers the advantages of being a hidden light source and energy efficiency. However, the tradeoff is that they are relatively permanent and may be unflattering.

== Types of housing ==
In North America, UL 1598 recessed housings generally fall into one of four categories.

1. IC or “insulation contact” rated new construction housings are attached to the ceiling supports before the ceiling surface is installed. If the area above the ceiling is accessible these fixtures may also be installed from within the attic space. IC housings must be installed wherever insulation will be in direct contact with the housing.
2. Non-IC rated new construction housings are used in the same situations as the IC rated new construction housings, only they require that there be no contact with insulation and at least 3 in (7.6 cm) spacing from insulation. These housings are typically rated up to 150 watts.
3. IC rated remodel housings are used in existing ceilings where insulation will be present and in contact with the fixture.
4. Non-IC rated remodel housings are used for existing ceilings where, ideally, no insulation is present. However, these also require that there be no contact with insulation and at least 3 in (7.6 cm) spacing from insulation. Sloped-ceiling housings are available for both insulated and non-insulated ceilings that are vaulted.

The main feature of the housing is designed to ensure that no flammable materials come into contact with the hot lighting fixture. Badly-housed downlights can be a fire hazard, though all newer ones contain a self-resetting thermal switch for safety.

The housings come in various sizes based on the diameter of the circular opening where the lamp is installed. The most commonly used sizes are 4, 5 and 6 inches in diameter, with 4 inch IC New Construction units less readily available at present. Smaller housings (2 and 3 inch) are also available for specialized uses.

The housing can also be "Air Tight", which means it will not allow air to escape into the ceiling or attic, thus reducing both heating and cooling costs.

The City of Chicago has an additional requirement, "Chicago Plenum", which requires the housing to be airtight in addition to requiring all wiring and to be sealed off and gasketed from the plenum air space. This housing rating must be used on all recessed luminaires installed in air plenums in the City of Chicago as well as nearby municipalities which have adopted the Chicago amendments to the NEC. The intent of this rating is to prevent potential sparks from escaping the luminaire into the air plenum and getting recirculated in the HVAC system.

IEC 60598 has two classifications.

1. Luminaires for recessing into ceilings with thermal insulating matting covering the luminaire.
2. Luminaires for recessing into ceilings but not suitable for covering with thermal insulating material.

== Trim styles ==
Recessed lighting styles have evolved with more manufacturers creating quality trims for a variety of applications. Recessed lighting trim usually comes in the standard baffle in black or white, which is the most popular. They are made to absorb extra light and create a crisp architectural appearance.

There are cone trims which produce a low-brightness aperture. Multipliers are offered which are designed to control the omnidirectional light from "A" style incandescent light bulbs and compact fluorescents.

Lens trim is designed to provide a diffused light and protect the lamp. Lensed trims are normally found in wet locations.

The luminous trims combine the diffused quality of lensed trim but with an open downlight component.

Adjustable trim allows for the adjustment of the light whether it is eyeball style, which protrudes from the trim or gimbal ring style, which adjusts inside the recess. These lights allow for full versatility.

Lastly, there are the wall-washer trims, which are designed to eliminate the often seen "scalloped light effect".

== Bulb types ==
There are two types of bulbs for recessed lighting: directional and diffuse. Directional lamps (R, BR, PAR, MR) contain reflectors that direct and control the light. Diffuse lamps (A, S, PS, G) provide omnidirectional light, which is directed by trim in the light fixture.
