= Bipin =

Bipin is a given name. Notable people with the given name include:

- Bipin Adhikari, Nepalese constitutional law scholar
- Bipin Krishna Bose (1851–1933), Indian advocate
- Bipin Chandran, Indian writer, screenwriter, and actor
- Bipin Ganatra (born c. 1957), Indian electrician
- Bipin Behari Ganguli (1887–1954), Indian politician
- Bipin Gupta (1905–1981), Indian actor and artist
- Bipin Jose (born 1987), Indian actor
- Bipin Joshi, Nepali student held hostage
- Bipin Chandra Joshi (1935–1994), Indian Chief of Army Staff
- Bipin Karki (born 1982), Nepalese film and theatre actor
- Bipin Chandra Pal (1858–1932), Indian nationalist, writer, orator, social reformer, and freedom fighter
- Bipin Rawat (1958–2021), Indian general
- Bipin Singh (politician) (born 1968), Indian politician
- Bipin Singh Thounaojam (born 1995), Indian footballer
- Bipin Varti (died 1995), Indian film actor, director, and producer

== See also ==
- Vipin, another Indian given name
- Bi-pin lamp base
