= Ganatra =

Ganatra is an Indian (Lohana) surname from Gujarat. Notable people with the surname include:

- Bipin Ganatra (born c. 1957), Indian firefighter
- Nisha Ganatra (born 1974), Canadian-American film director, screenwriter, producer and actress
- Nitin Ganatra (born 1968), Kenyan-born British actor
- Paresh Ganatra (born 1965), Indian television, stage and film actor
- Vaishnavi Ganatra, Indian actress
