= T5 retrofit conversion =

T5 retrofit conversion is a means of converting light fittings designed to use T8 format lamps, so that they can use more energy-efficient T5 lamps. This is done by electronically converting the luminaires to high frequency operation.

== Differences from other fluorescent lamps ==
T5 lamps are approximately 40% smaller than T8 Lamps. T5 lamps have a G5 base while T8 lamps use a G13 base.

== Conversion technology ==
Conversion kits are available which will work in existing fittings containing switch start, mains frequency fluorescent lamp ballasts. The kits convert the fittings to use energy efficient, high frequency ballasts and accommodate the smaller diameter T5 lamp.

The magnetic ballast remains in place but it is bypassed, rendering it ineffective as a conductor. The new high-frequency ballast draws only 2 W, rather than the 6-10 W of the old ballast, increasing the efficiency of the system. Changing to this type of lamp without taking the ballast out of operation (rather than simply bypassing it) results in an increased power factor for the fitting. This increase in power is a result of the separate coils used in an electric ballast, as opposed to the single coil in a magnetic ballast, because it allows the electricity to flow more consistently.

There are tree main types of conversion kits:

- Lamp-end type – Kits which include a replacement starter and two separate components to fit over each end of the T5 lamp. The lamp is then slotted into the existing fitting.
- Baton type – One piece kits which slot into the existing fitting and into which the T5 lamp is placed.
- IP65 types – Waterproof

== Energy efficiency ==
T5 retrofit conversion can maintain existing lighting levels with the higher efficiency of the T5 lamp. However, with kits that operates the lamp on the existing magnetic ballast, the efficiency drops and the lamp life is considerably shortened, as T5 lamps aren't designed to be operated on mains frequency but only on high frequency.
