= FEL =

Fel or FEL may refer to:

- Fel, a commune in France
- Foundation for Endangered Languages, a charity supporting threatened languages around the world
- FEL lamp
- Free-electron laser
- Front-end loader
- Front-end loading
- Front End Loader, an Australian rock band
- Feltham railway station, in London
- Marie Fel (1713–1794), French opera singer
- Tomášov (Hungarian: Fél), a village and municipality in Slovakia
- Fürstenfeldbruck Air Base, is a former German Air Force airfield near the town of Fürstenfeldbruck in Bavaria, near Munich, Germany
