= Halog =

Halog may refer to:

- Halog (city), the capital of the former Princely State of Dhami in India
- a tradename for Halcinonide
- Two islands in the Quiniluban Group in Palawan Province, Philippines

== See also ==
- Halogen (disambiguation)
