= Halogen (disambiguation) =

The halogens are a series of chemical elements.

Halogen may also refer to:

- Halogen (album), by Whitehouse
- Halogen (band), an Australian musical group
- Halogen lamp, a type of incandescent light bulb
- Halogen oven, a type of cooker utilising halogen bulbs
- Halogen Foundation, a not-for-profit in Singapore
- Halogen Software, a Canadian company that provides cloud-based talent management solutions
- Halogen TV, a US cable network
