= Fluorescent-lamp formats =

Types of lamp

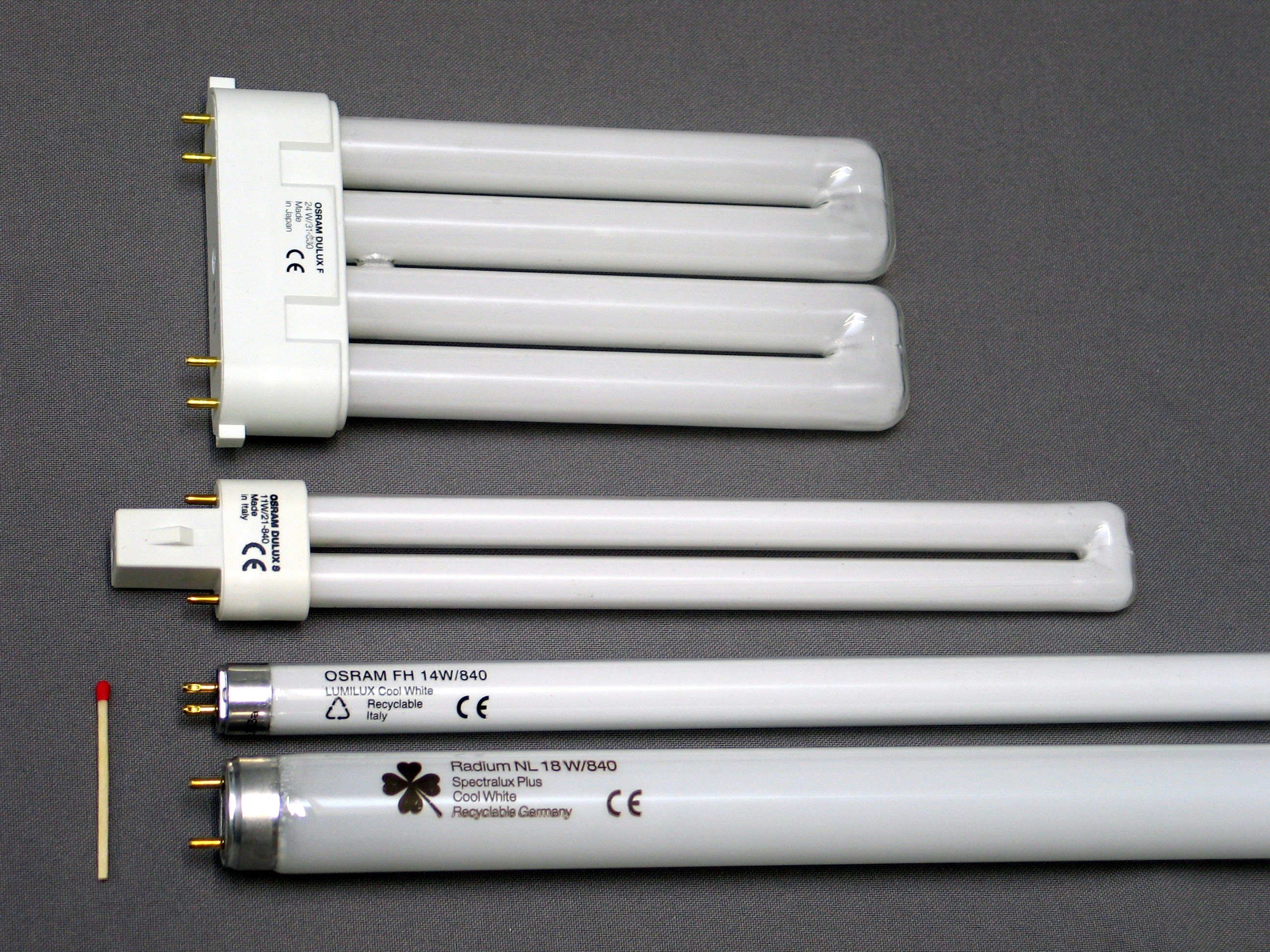
Fluorescent lamps in various embodiments

Since their introduction as a commercial product in 1939, many different types of fluorescent lamp have been introduced. Systematic nomenclature identifies mass-market lamps as to overall shape, power rating, length, color, and other electrical and illuminating characteristics.

== Tube designations ==
In the United States and Canada, lamps are typically identified by a code such as FxxTyy, where F is for fluorescent, and the first number (xx) indicates either the power in watts for bi-pin lamps, length in inches for single-pin and high-output lamps, and for circular bulbs, the diameter of the circular bulb. The T indicates that the shape of the bulb is tubular, and the last number (yy) is the diameter in eighths of an inch (sometimes in millimeters, rounded up to the nearest millimeter). Typical diameters are T12 or T38 (1 1/2 in or 38 mm) for larger, often less efficient lamps, T8 or T26 (1 in or 25 mm) for smaller and often energy-saving lamps, and T5 or T16 (5/8 in or 16 mm) for very small lamps, which may even operate from a battery-powered device.

Fluorescent tube diameter designation comparison
Designation		Tube diameter		Extra	
Designation		(in)	(mm)	Socket	Notes
T2		1/4 approx.	7	WP4.5×8.5d	Osram's Fluorescent Miniature (FM) tubes; Sylvania Luxline Slim T2 Linear
T4		1/2	12.7	G5 bi-pin	Slim lamps. Power ratings and lengths not standardized (and not the same) between different manufacturers
T5	T16	5/8	15.9	G5 bi-pin; 2GX13 quad-pin; G10q quad-pin	Original 4–13 W miniature fluorescent range from 1950s or earlier.; Two newer ranges, high-efficiency (HE) 14–35 W, and high-output (HO) 24–80 W, introduced in the 1990s.; Panasonic's range of FHL fluorescent tubes in 18W, 27W, and 36W varieties for the Japanese market.; Circular fluorescent tubes.; Thorn/General Electric 2D fluorescent lamps and other similar lamps from various manufacturers.
T6		3/4	19.05	Fa8 single-pin; G10q quad-pin	Single-pin fluorescent lamps.; Thorn/General Electric 2D fluorescent lamps and other similar lamps from various manufacturers.
T8	T26	1	25.4	G13 bi-pin; Fa8 single-pin; R17d recessed double contact	One of the first diameters of fluorescent lamps, with the 15W T8 and 30W T8 having been introduced in 1938. The European energy-saving krypton T8 lamps were introduced by Thorn EMI during the 1970s. The North American energy-saving argon T8 lamps weren't introduced until the 1980s. The newer European tubes from the 1970s are T12 retrofits if used with preheat/switchstart and electronic ballasts only, but the North American tubes from the 1980s have never been retrofits.
T9	T29	1 1/8	28.6	G10q quad-pin; G13 bi-pin	Circular fluorescent tubes; Some linear tubes
T10		1 1/4	31.75	G13 bi-pin; G10q quad-pin	High-lumen retrofit lamps for 40W T12 lamps in North America.; Popular tube diameter in Japan and Brazil.; Circular 32W and 40W T10 lamps (Older versions of the 32W and 40W T9 lamps)
T12	T38	1 1/2	38.1	G13 bi-pin; Fa8 single-pin; R17d recessed double contact	One of the first diameters of fluorescent lamps, with the 15W T12 and 20W T12 having been introduced in 1938. These are less energy-efficient than thinner fluorescent tube formats and LEDs.
T17		2 1/8	54	G20 Mogul bi-pin	Large size for 90W T17 (preheat) and 40W T17 (instant start)
PG17		2 1/8	54	R17d Recessed double contact	General Electric's Power Groove tubes

For T2–T12 and T17, the number indicates the tube diameter in 1/8 inches, e.g. T2 → 2/8 in and T17 → 17/8 in. Whereas for T16 and T26–T38, the number indicates the approximate tube diameter in millimeters.

=== Reflectors ===
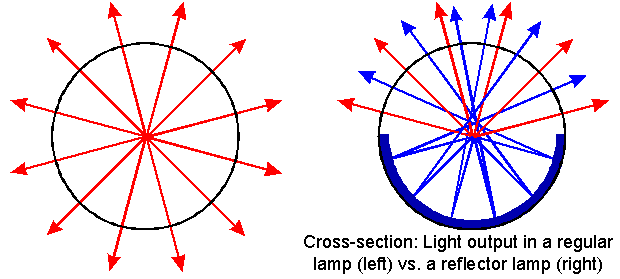
Cross section of a typical fluorescent lamp with and without a reflector

Some lamps have an internal opaque reflector. Coverage of the reflector ranges from 120° to 310° of the lamp's circumference.

Reflector lamps are used when light is only desired to be emitted in a single direction, or when an application requires the maximum amount of light. For example, these lamps can be used in tanning beds or in backlighting electronic displays. An internal reflector is more efficient than standard external reflectors. Another example is color matched aperture lights (with about 30° of opening) used in the food industry for robotic quality control inspection of cooked goods.

Aperture lamps have a clear break in the phosphor coating, typically of 30°, to concentrate light in one direction and provide higher brightness in the beam than can be achieved by uniform phosphor coatings. Aperture lamps include reflectors over the non-aperture area. Aperture lamps were commonly used in photocopiers in the 1960s and 1970s where a bank of fixed tubes was arranged to light up the image to be copied, but are rarely found nowadays. Aperture lamps can produce a concentrated beam of light suitable for edge-lit signs.

=== Single-pin lamps ===
Single-pin lamps (Also generically called "Slimline" in the United States) operate on an instant start ballast in the United States and Canada or on a series choke without a starter in 220-240V countries.

=== High-output/very high output lamps ===
High-output lamps are brighter and are driven at a higher electric current. They have a recessed double contact (R17d) base on each end, rather than a standard bi-pin base, which prevents them from being installed into the wrong fixture. Since about the early to mid-1950s to today, General Electric has developed and improved the Power Groove lamp. These lamps are recognizable by their large diameter (2 1/8 in or 54 mm) and grooved tube shape.

=== Colors ===
Colors using a calcium halophosphate formulation are usually indicated by WW for warm white, W for (neutral) white, CW for cool white, and D for the bluish daylight white.

Philips and Osram use numeric color codes for tri-phosphor and multi-phosphor colors. The first digit indicates the color rendering index (CRI) of the lamp. If the first digit on a lamp says 8, then the CRI of that lamp will be approximately 85. The last two digits indicate the color temperature of the lamp in kelvins (K). For example, if the last two digits on a lamp say 41, that lamp's color temperature will be 4100 K, which is a common tri-phosphor cool white fluorescent lamp.

BL is used for ultraviolet lamps commonly used in bug zappers. BLB is used for blacklight-blue lamps employing a Wood's glass envelope to filter out most visible light, commonly used in nightclubs. Other non-standard designations apply for plant lights or grow lights.

Calcium halophosphate tubes
Japanese color code	Numeric color code	Alphabetic color code	Color	Approximate CRI	Color temperature (K)
N/A	29	WW	Warm white	≈52	3000
WW	35	W	White	≈56	3500
W	33	CW	Cool White	≈62	4000-4300
N/A	25	N/A	Neutral/Universal White	≈75	4000
N	N/A	N/A	Natural Daylight	≈70	5000
D	54	D	Daylight	≈75	6500
Deluxe halophosphate tubes
Japanese color code	Numeric color code	Alphabetic color code	Color	Approximate CRI	Color temperature (K)
L-EDL	27	N/A	Deluxe Extra Warm White	≈95	2700
N/A	32	WWX	Deluxe Warm White	≈77	3000
N/A	N/A	WX	Sylvania White Deluxe	≈85	3500
N/A	79	N	Natural	≈90	3600
N/A	34	N/A	Deluxe White	≈85	3850
W-SDL	38	CWX	Deluxe Cool White/Kolor-rite	≈90	4000
N/A	N/A	C41	GE Cool White Utility (Enhanced CWX)	≈87	4100
N-SDL, N-EDL	N/A	C50/DSGN50	GE Chroma 50/Philips Colortone 50/Sylvania Design 50	≈90-99	5000
D-SDL, D-EDL	55	DX	Deluxe Daylight/Northlight/Colour Matching	≈88-98	6500
N/A	N/A	C75	GE Chroma 75/Philips Colortone 75	≈92	7500
700-series tubes (Calcium halophosphate and rare-earths tri-phosphor blend)
Numeric color code	Alphanumeric color code	Color	Approximate CRI	Color temperature (K)	
730	SP30/D30/TL730	Warm White	≈75	3000	
735	SP35/D35/TL735	Neutral White	≈75	3500	
741	SP41/D41/TL741	Cool White	≈75	4100	
750	SP50/TL750	Natural Daylight	≈75	5000	
765	SP65/TL765	Cool Daylight	≈75	6500	
800-series rare-earth tri-phosphor tubes
Japanese Color Code	Numeric color code	Color	Approximate CRI	Color temperature (K)	
ELX	825	Extra Warm White	≈85	2500	
ELR, ELC	827, 828	Warm White	≈85	2700, 2800	
EX-L, EL, ELK	830	Warm White	≈85	3000	
ELW	832	Warm White	≈85	3200	
EX-WW, EWW	835	Neutral White	≈85	3500	
EW38	838	Neutral White	≈85	3800	
EX-W, EW	840, 841, 842	Cool White	≈85	4000, 4100, 4200	
EX-N, EN	850	Natural Daylight	≈85	5000	
ENW, ENM, ENC	852, 853	Natural Daylight	≈85	5200, 5300	
ENK	855	Natural Daylight	≈85	5500	
ENX	858	Natural Daylight	≈85	5800	
EDW	862	Cool Daylight	≈85	6200	
EX-D, ED	865, 867	Cool Daylight	≈85	6500, 6700	
ECW, EDK, EDC	872, 874	Cool Daylight	≈85	7200, 7400	
EDF, EDX	880	Skywhite	≈85	8000	
900-series deluxe rare-earth phosphors tubes
Numeric color code		Color	Approximate CRI	Color temperature (K)	
930		Warm white	≈95	3000	
941		Cool white	≈95	4100	
950		Natural Daylight	≈98	5000	
965		Cool daylight	≈95	6500	
Special purpose tubes
Numeric code	Alphabetic Code	Fluorescent lamp type	Notes		
05	N/A	Germicidal lamps	No phosphors used in these lamps at all, and the enveplope is made of fused quartz instead of glass. In the American lamp code, the F as in FxxTyy is replaced by a G as in GxxTyy, indicating that it's a germicidal lamp.		
08	BLB	Black-Light Blue lamps	These lamps are similar to the regular black light lamps, except they use wood's glass as a filter to reduce the amount of visible light emitted. These lamps are used for fluorescence effects where less visible light is ideal.		
09	N/A	Sun-tanning lamps	These lamps produce wide or narrow band UV-B radiation		
10	BL	Black-Light lamps	Black light lamps give off long-wave UV-A radiation of around 350-400 nm. They are often used to attract insects to traps. Unlike black light blue lamps, these lamps do not use wood's glass. They use regular soda-lime glass and emit more visible light than BLB lamps.		

== Common tube ratings ==
This section lists the more common tube ratings for general lighting. Many more tube ratings exist, often country-specific. The Nominal Length may not exactly match any measured dimension of the tube. For some tube sizes, the nominal length (in feet) is the required spacing between centers of the lighting fixtures to create a continuous run, so the tubes are a little shorter than the nominal length.

Tube diameter in 1/8 in (3.175 mm)	Nominal length	Nominal power (W)	Lamp Code
T5 Miniature	0.5 ft (152 mm)	4	F4T5
T5 Miniature	0.75 ft (229 mm)	6	F6T5
T5 Miniature	1 ft (305 mm)	8	F8T5
T5 Miniature	1.75 ft (533 mm)	13	F13T5
T5/HE	1.83 ft (560 mm)	14	F14T5
T5/HE	2.83 ft (860 mm)	21	F21T5
T5/HE	3.83 ft (1,170 mm)	28	F28T5
T5/HE	4.83 ft (1,470 mm)	35	F35T5
T5/HO	1.83 ft (560 mm)	24	F24T5/HO
T5/HO	2.83 ft (860 mm)	39	F39T5/HO
T5/HO	3.83 ft (1,170 mm)	54	F54T5/HO
T5/HO	4.83 ft (1,470 mm)	80	F80T5/HO
T8	1.25 ft (381 mm)	14	F14T8
T8	1.5 ft (460 mm)	15	F15T8
T8	2 ft (610 mm)	17	F17T8
T8	2 ft (610 mm)	18	N/A
T8	3 ft (914 mm)	25	F25T8
T8	3 ft (914 mm)	30	F30T8
T8	4 ft (1,219 mm)	32	F32T8
T8	4 ft (1,219 mm)	36	N/A
T8	5 ft (1,524 mm)	40	F40T8
T8	5 ft (1,524 mm)	58	N/A
T8	6 ft (1,829 mm)	70	N/A
T8 single-pin	6 ft (1,829 mm)	38	F72T8
T8 single-pin	8 ft (2,438 mm)	51	F96T8
T8 single-pin	8 ft (2,438 mm)	59	F96T8
T8/HO	4 ft (1,219 mm)	44	F48T8/HO
T8/HO	5 ft (1,524 mm)	55	F60T8/HO
T8/HO	6 ft (1,829 mm)	65	F72T8/HO
T8/HO	8 ft (2,438 mm)	86	F96T8/HO
T12	1.25 ft (381 mm)	14	F14T12
T12	1.5 ft (457 mm)	15	F15T12
T12	2 ft (610 mm)	20	F20T12
T12	3 ft (914 mm)	30	F30T12
T12	4 ft (1,219 mm)	40	F40T12
T12	5 ft (1,524 mm)	65	N/A
T12	5 ft (1,524 mm)	80	N/A
T12	6 ft (1,829 mm)	75	N/A
T12	6 ft (1,829 mm)	85	N/A
T12	8 ft (2,438 mm)	125	N/A
T12 single-pin	4 ft (1,219 mm)	39	F48T12
T12 single-pin	6 ft (1,829 mm)	55	F72T12
T12 single-pin	8 ft (2,438 mm)	75	F96T12
T12/HO	4 ft (1,219 mm)	60	F48T12/HO
T12/HO	5 ft (1,524 mm)	75	F60T12/HO
T12/HO	6 ft (1,829 mm)	85	F72T12/HO
T12/HO	8 ft (2,438 mm)	110	F96T12/HO
T12/VHO	4 ft (1,219 mm)	115	F48T12/VHO
T12/VHO	6 ft (1,829 mm)	160	F72T12/VHO
T12/VHO	8 ft (2,438 mm)	215	F96T12/VHO

=== European energy-saving tubes ===
In the 1970s, Thorn Lighting introduced an energy-saving 8 ft retrofit tube in Europe. Designed to run on the existing 125 W (240 V) series ballast but with a different gas fill and operating voltage, the tube operated at only 100 W. Increased efficiency meant that the tube produced only 9% lumen reduction for a 20% power reduction. This first energy-saving tube design remains a T12 tube even today. However, follow-on retrofit replacements for all the other original T12 tubes were T8, which helped with creating the required electrical characteristics and saving on the then new (and more expensive) polyphosphor/triphosphor coatings, and these were even more efficient. Note that because these tubes were all designed as retrofit tubes to be fitted in T12 fittings running on series ballasts on 220–240 V supplies, they could not be used in 120 V mains countries with inherently different control gear designs.

Type	Diameter (in, mm)	Nominal length (ft, m)	Nominal power (W)	Notes
T8	1.0, 25	2, 0.6	18	Retrofit replacement for 2 ft T12 20 W
T8	1.0, 25	4, 1.2	36	Retrofit replacement for 4 ft T12 40 W
T8	1.0, 25	5, 1.5	58	Retrofit replacement for 5 ft T12 65 W
T8	1.0, 25	6, 1.8	70	Retrofit replacement for 6 ft T12 75 W
T12	1.5, 38	8, 2.4	100	Retrofit replacement for 8 ft T12 125 W

Around 1980 (in the UK, at least), some new fluorescent fittings were designed to take only the newer, retrofit tubes (the lamp holders are designed not to take T12 tubes, except for 8 ft length). The earlier T12 halophosphate tubes still remained available as spares until 2012. They fit in older fittings and some modern fittings that employ twist lock lamp holders, even though the modern fittings were not electrically designed for them.

=== US energy-saving tubes ===
In the 1970s, 34-watt energy-saving F40T12 fluorescent lamps were introduced in the United States. In the 1980s, T8 32-watt lamps were introduced, but unlike the T8 tubes introduced in Europe, these T8s are not retrofits and require new matching ballasts to drive them. These ballasts were originally magnetic, but most today are electronic. The energy-saving T12 lamps are made to operate on ballasts designed for 40-watt F40T12 lamps, though some F40T12 ballasts are not be designed to operate these lamps, and can overheat if energy-saving lamps are used. Running an energy-saving T8 tube with a ballast for T12 will reduce lamp life and can increase energy consumption. Conversely, a T12 tube on a T8 ballast will usually draw too much power and so may burn out the ballast, unless it is within the range that particular ballast can compensate for. The tube type should always match the markings on the light fixture.

Type	Diameter (in, mm)	Nominal length (ft)	Nominal power (W)	Lamp Code	Notes
T5	0.625, 16	4	49	F49T5	Retrofit replacement for 45.8 in T5HO 54 W
T8	1.0, 25	4	25	F32T8/25w	Retrofit replacement for 4 ft T8 32 W
T8	1.0, 25	4	28	F28T8 F32T8/28w	Retrofit replacement for 4 ft T8 32 W
T8	1.0, 25	4	30	F32T8/ES	Retrofit replacement for 4 ft T8 32 W
T8	1.0, 25	2	17	F17T8	Ballast-swap replacement for 2 ft T12 20 W
T8	1.0, 25	3	25	F25T8	Ballast-swap replacement for 3 ft T12 30 W
T8	1.0, 25	4	32	F32T8	Ballast-swap replacement for 4 ft T12 40 W
T8	1.0, 25	8	59	F96T8	Ballast-swap replacement for 8 ft T12 75 W single-pin
T12	1.5, 38	4	"25"	F40UTSL	Retrofit replacement for 4 ft T12 40 W on underpowered residential-grade rapid start magnetic ballasts. These are F40CW lamps made with lighter cathodes that can only handle a lower amount of power. They will function as a standard 40 W lamp on full-power ballasts, but may not last as long. These lamps are typically rated to last for 12,000 hours on a residential-grade ballast and only 6000 hours on a commercial-grade one.
T12	1.5, 38	4	32	F40T12/ESP	Retrofit replacement for 4 ft T12 40 W
T12	1.5, 38	4	34	F34T12 F40T12/ES	Retrofit replacement for 4 ft T12 40 W
T12	1.5, 38	8	60	F96T12/ES	Retrofit replacement for 8 ft T12 75 W single-pin
T12	1.5, 38	8	95	F96T12/HO/ES	Retrofit replacement for 8 ft T12 110 W high-output

== T5 tubes ==
In the 1990s, longer T5 tubes were designed in Europe (making it to North America in the 2000s), in addition to the shorter ones (mentioned above) already in use worldwide. Like the European modular furniture, display cabinets, ceiling tile grids, etc. they were designed for, these are based on multiples of the 300 mm (11.8 in) "metric foot" instead of the 12 in (305 mm) imperial foot, but are all 37 mm (1.5 in) shorter to allow space for the lampholder connections within the 300 mm modular units, and for much easier insertion into and removal from troffer lights within a grid.

Tube diameter is 5/8 in (15.875 mm)	Length	Nominal power (W)		Notes
Tube diameter is 5/8 in (15.875 mm)	Length	High-efficiency	High-output	Notes
T5	563 mm (22.2 in)	14	24	Fits within a 0.6 m modular unit
T5	863 mm (34.0 in)	21	39	Fits within a 0.9 m modular unit
T5	1,163 mm (45.8 in)	28	54	Fits within a 1.2 m modular unit
T5	1,463 mm (57.6 in)	35	80	Fits within a 1.5 m modular unit

The T5 diameter is nearly 40% smaller than T8 lamps and almost 60% smaller than T12 lamps. T5 lamps have a G5 base (bi-pin with 5 mm spacing), even for high-output (HO and VHO) tubes.

== Electrical parameters of linear tubes ==
	Power	Lamp voltage	Lamp current
T4	7W	32V	0,195A
T4	10W	42V	0,210A
T4	18W	65V	0,228A
T5HE	14W	86V	0,165A
T5HE	21W	126V	0,165A
T5HE	28W	166V	0,170A
T5HE	35W	205V	0,175A
T5HO	24W	77V	0,295A
T5HO	39W	118V	0,325A
T5HO	49W	195V	0,299A
T5HO	54W	120V	0,455A
T5HO	80W	152V	0,530A
T5	6W	42V	0,160A
T5	8W	56V	0,145A
T5	13W	95V	0,165A
T8	14W	38V	0,395A
T8	15W	55V	0,310A
T8	18W	57V	0,370A
T8	25W	84V	0,360A
T8	30W	96V	0,365A
T8	32W	135V	0,265A
T8	36W	103V	0,430A
T8	58W	110V	0,670A
T8	70W	128V	0,700A
T9C	22W	62V	0,400A
T9C	32W	84V	0,450A
T9C	40W	115V	0,415A
T12	20W	57V	0,370A
T12	40W	103V	0,430A
T12	75W	130V	0,670A
T12	85W	120V	0,800A
T12 single pin	52W	136V	0,425A
T12 single pin	55W	149V	0,425A
T12 single pin	75W	197V	0,425A
T12 HO	60W	79V	0,800A
T12 HO	70W	95V	0,800A
T12 HO	85W	116V	0,800A
T12 HO	110W	152V	0,800A
T12 HO	115W	83V	1,500A
T12 HO	135W	109V	1,500A
T12 HO	160W	124V	1,500A
T12 HO	215W	145V	1,500A

== See also ==
- Compact fluorescent lamp
- List of light sources
- Fluorescent lamp recycling
- T5 retrofit conversion
