= Lightbulb socket =

Holder and connection for electrical lamps

A lightbulb socket, lightbulb holder, light socket, lamp socket or lamp holder is a device which mechanically supports and provides electrical connections for a compatible electric lamp base. Sockets allow lamps to be safely and conveniently replaced (re-lamping). There are many different standards for lampholders, including early de facto standards and later standards created by various standards bodies. Many of the later standards conform to a general coding system in which a socket type is designated by a letter or abbreviation followed by a number.

The most common type of sockets for mains electricity are Edison screws, used in continental Europe and North America, while bayonet mounts dominate in the Commonwealth countries, except Canada, and in the automotive industry. Fluorescent lamps typically require a two-pin, unthreaded socket.

Not all lamps require a socket; for example, some miniature lamps have wire leads suitable for direct connection to screw terminals or other wires, and some reflector lamps provide screw terminals for electrical connections.

== History ==
Early experimental incandescent lamps employed wire leads which had to be connected to screw terminals, but this was inconvenient for commercial use. The Edison organization used simple wooden receptacles with internal copper strips for lamps on the commercial steamship SS Columbia, the first ship to use electric light bulbs. These sockets included switches, but required bulbs to be mounted upright.

The Edison organization developed a screw-base in 1880 which was initially made of wood but later made of plaster of Paris. Many competitive designs of lamps and sockets appeared in the early era of incandescent lighting, which often were incompatible with other designs.

== Construction and materials ==
The construction of a lampholder socket defines and limits its intended primary use. Ceramic insulation can withstand considerably higher operating temperatures than bakelite or other plastics. The electrical components and wires must be designed to carry the intended current plus a safety factor.

The contact surface area, thickness and conductivity of the metal, connection methods and maximum operating temperature must all be considered in the design of a new socket. In addition, mechanical factors such as shape of the socket, fixture mounting and attachment, lamp support, ease of re-lamping and total cost of manufacture must be considered. Sockets designed for ordinary household and industrial use have much more design leeway than those used in precision applications.

The lampholder must be located far enough from the filament that the metals with the lowest melting point will remain solid. Historically this metal was a tin/lead solder whose melting point might be as low as 180 °C (356 °F) Due to the thermal changes from ambient temperature to full operating temperature, the design of a socket must allow for a considerable amount of expansion and contraction. Spring elements are required to accommodate these dimensional changes. However, the temperature at which a metal loses its spring is far below the melting point. This is why some older sockets that no longer work can be restored by prying up the base spring slightly.

Lampholder failures are usually caused by mechanical abuse or by overheating. A socket with a built-in switch is far more likely to fail in normal use as the switch parts wear out. Insulation failures are usually caused by impacts or by difficulty inserting or removing a lamp. Sockets used outdoors or in damp areas often suffer from corrosion which can cause the lamp to "stick" in the socket and attempts to change a lamp can result in breakage of either the lamp or the lampholder. The corrosion is not only environmentally produced but may be a result of the current flowing through the parts when there is appreciable resistance between the parts. Fixtures in such environments may require gaskets or other waterproofing methods to prevent buildup of moisture in the socket area.

== Edison screw bases ==
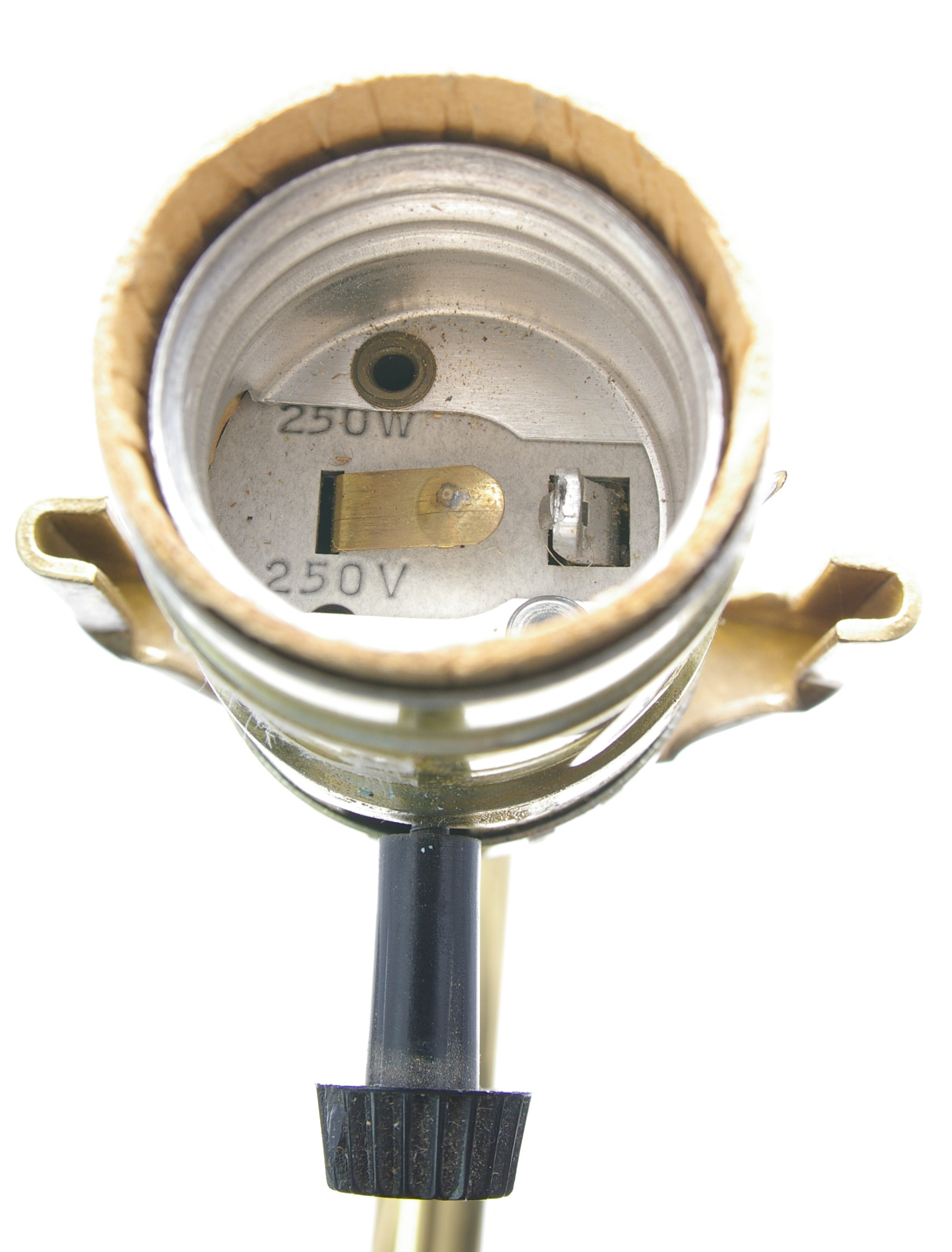
A standard American three-way lightbulb socket

- E10s Miniature (Flashlight lamp)
- E11s Mini-Candelabra
- E12s Candelabra
- E14s European
- E17s Intermediate
- E26s Medium
- E26d Three-way Medium (modified socket with additional ring contact for 3-way lamps)
- E27s European
- E39s Mogul
- E39d Three-way Mogul (modified socket with additional ring contact for 3-way lamps)
- E40s European
- Skirted (PAR-38)

The light bulb commonly used since the early 20th century for general-purpose lighting applications, with a pear-like shape and an Edison screw base, is referred to as an "A-series light bulb." This most common general purpose bulb type would be classed as "A19/E26" or the metric version "A60/E27".

== Bi-post ==
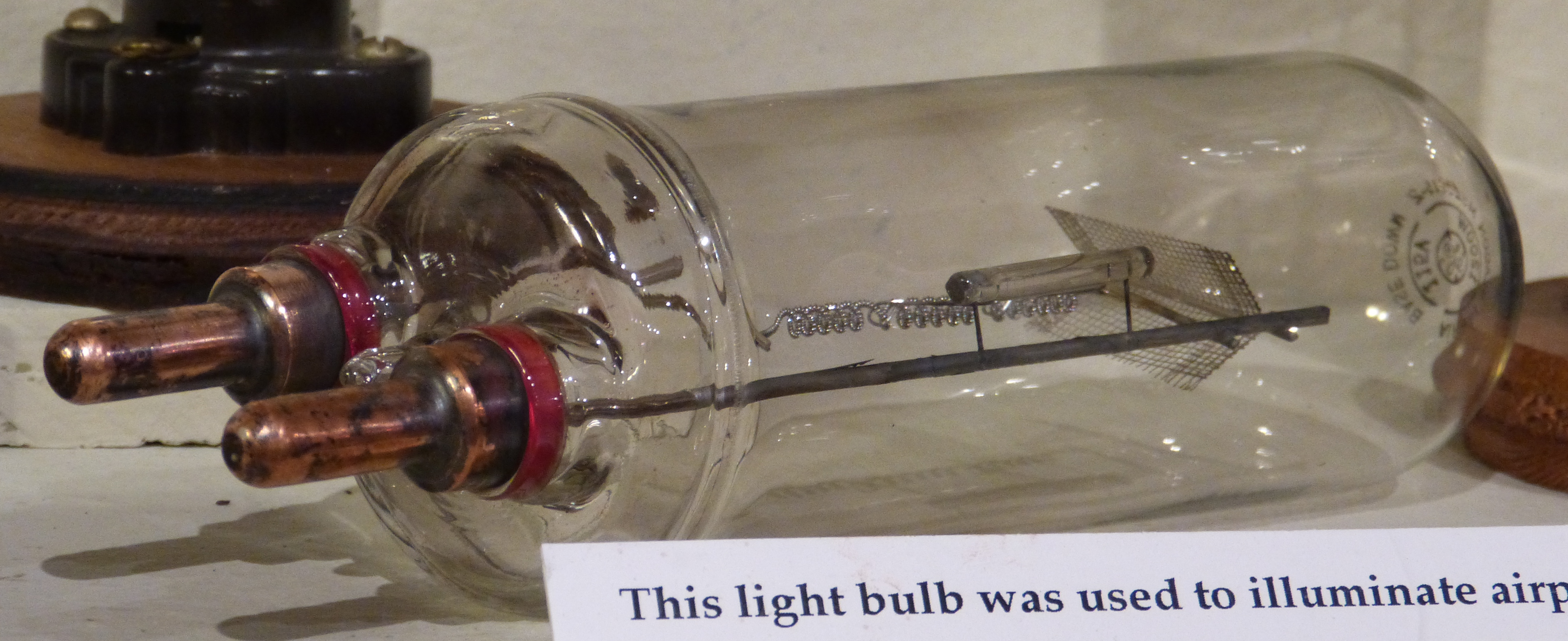
115-volt airway beacon light bulb with a Mogul bi-post base

With bi-post bases, the lamp orientation is fixed so that the filament will always be in the focal plane. Filament configurations such as the C13D (coiled, zigzagged) emit far more light perpendicular to the zigzag than parallel to it.

- Mogul bi-post (G38) can handle up to 100 amps and is used with searchlights and film & stage lighting fixtures of 1000 watts or larger. Incandescent, halogen and HMI light sources use this design.
- Medium bi-post (G22) is used with film & stage lighting fixtures between 250 and 1000 watts.
- Mini bi-post (G4-G6)

Common types:

- G4 – 4 mm (0.15748 in) pin spacing
  - GU4 & GZ4 – same as G4 and only denote what lamp mount clip is needed to hold the actual light bulb in place
- G5.3 – 5.3 mm (0.20866 in) pin spacing
  - GU5.3, GX5.3, GY5.3, GZ5.3 – same as G5.3 and only denote what lamp mount clip is needed to hold the actual light bulb in place
- G6.35 – 6.35 mm (0.25 in)spacing
  - GY6.35 & GZ6.35 – same as G6.35 and only denote what lamp mount clip is needed to hold the actual light bulb in place
- G8 – 8 mm (0.31496 in) pin spacing
  - GU8 – same as G8 and only denotes what lamp mount clip is needed to hold the actual light bulb in place
- GY8.6 – 8.6 mm (0.33858 in) pin spacing
- G9 – 9 mm (0.35433 in) pin spacing
- G12 – 12 mm (0.47244 in) pin spacing

== Bi-pin connector ==
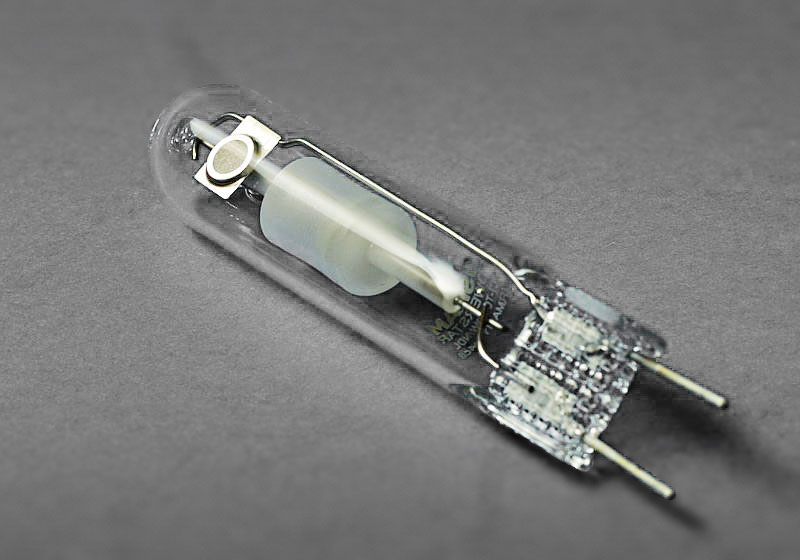
Metal halide lamp with G8.5 base

- Medium bi-pin is used on each end of a T12 fluorescent lamp
- Mini bi-pin is used with MR16 halogen lamps

The two-pin socket is an update of the bi-post design with smaller pins designed to reduce the cost of manufacture. The 1000-watt FEL medium two-pin base halogen lamp allows designers to insert the lamp into the end of the ellipsoidal reflector through a smaller hole than previously possible with conventional incandescent lamps. This improves efficiency compared to the older side-inserted lamp or a double-ended lamp which requires two holes. One variation is the polarized two-pin socket – used primarily in projectors, which defines the exact positioning of the filament on one side. This improves the "point source" characteristic necessary for building complex optical systems.

Another facet of the two-pin design is that many new designs of lamps use baseless glass envelopes. The wire leads are thickened and crimped in the glass envelope of the lamp base. The MR16 is an example of this design; the actual lamp is inserted into the reflector with the leads sticking out and a ceramic paste used to glue it in.

== Bayonet styles ==
A bayonet mount

- BA9s Miniature bayonet
- B15s Single Contact Bayonet
- B15d Double Contact Bayonet
- BA15d Indexed DC Bayonet
- B22d Double Contact Bayonet – the standard "BC" (bayonet cap) used for domestic lighting in the UK and other Commonwealth countries.
- Bayonet Candelabra with prefocusing collar
- P28s Medium prefocus
- P40s Mogul prefocus

== Wedge base ==
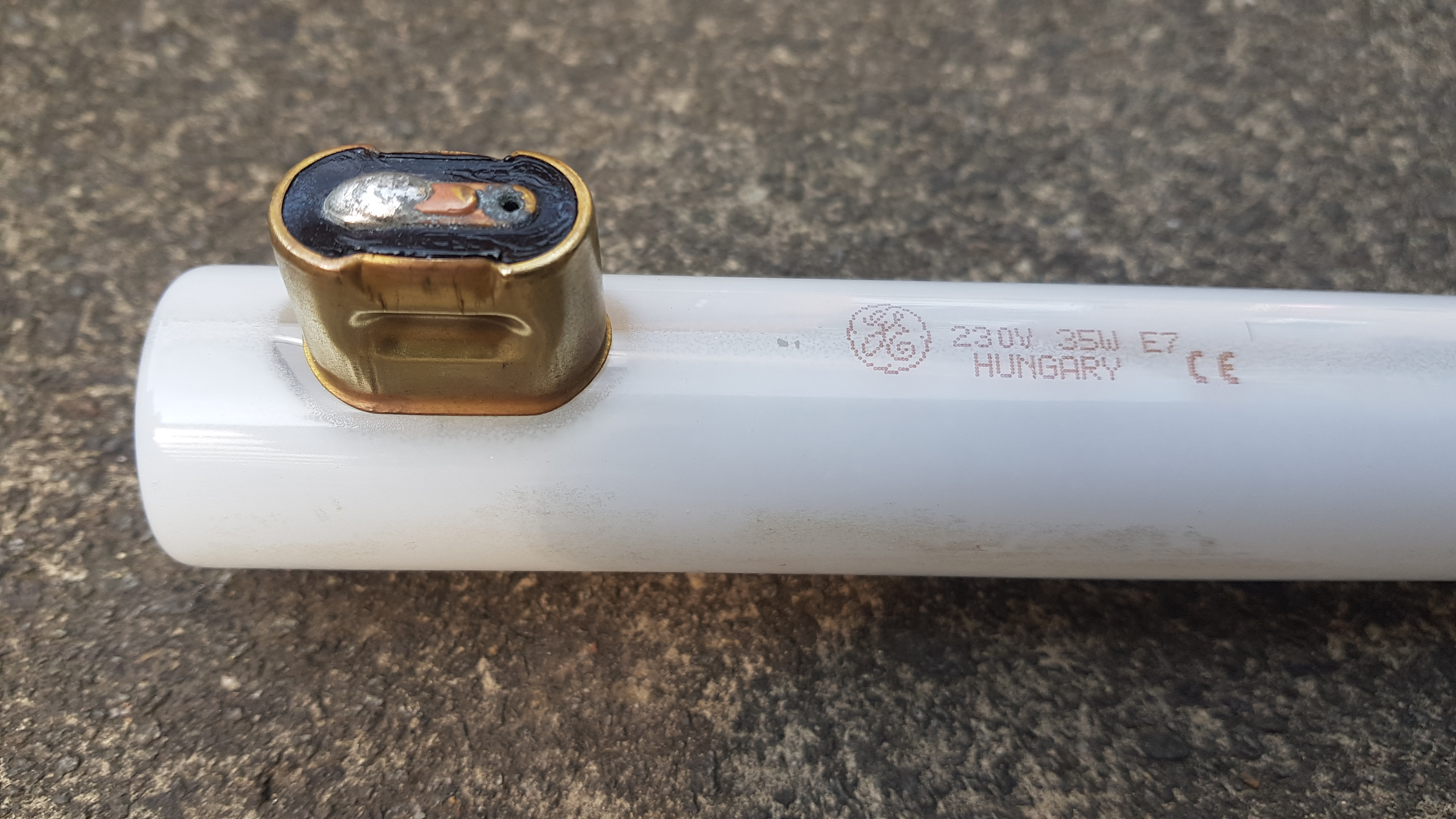
Architectural strip lamp with S14s connection

Miniature lamps may have a wedge base made of glass or plastic. The base may be an extension of the glass envelope of the bulb, with the wire leads of the lamp folded up at the base. Some wedge bases are made of plastic and slipped over the wire leads. A wedge base holds the lamp by spring compression in the socket. The lamp is inserted and removed without twisting. Wedge base lamps are widely used in automotive applications, and many Christmas lights strings use plastic wedge-based bulbs.

Other wedge bases include strip lamps, sometimes called architectural lamps, with S14s connections. These lamps are used in display cabinets or over mirrors and have been widely replaced by LED equivalents.

== Fluorescent tubular lamp ==
Fluorescent Linear Tube Light bulbs are measured in 1/8 of inches. So a T12 fluorescent is 12/8 of an inch in diameter or 12/8 = 1.50"

- T4 – 4/8 or 0.500 in (12.7 mm) in diameter
- T5 – 5/8 or 0.625 in (15.875 mm) in diameter
- T8 – 8/8 or 1.00 in (25.4 mm) in diameter
- T10 – 10/8 or 1.25 in (31.75 mm) in diameter
- T12 – 12/8 or 1.5 in (38.1 mm) in diameter

Linear tubes are usually equipped on both sides with G13 bi-pin socket (T8, T10, T12) or G5 bi-pin socket (T4, T5). Other sockets are used for compact fluorescent lamps.

== Lamp base styles ==
Abbreviation	Term
Cand	Candelabra
DCB	Double contact bayonet candelabra
DC Pf	Double contact prefocus candelabra
EMEP	Extended mogul end prong ferrule contact
F	Ferrule contact
Mc	Minican
Med	Medium
Med Bp	Medium bipost
Med Pf	Medium Prefocus
Med Skt	Medium Skirted
Med 2P	Medium two pin
MEP	Mogul End Prong
Mog	Mogul
Mog Bp	Mogul bipost
Mog Pf	Mogul prefocus
MS	Miniature screw (with reference shoulder)
MSP	Medium side prong
G38 Bp	G38 mogul bipost
R7S	Also known as a double ended halogen lamp. Mainly used with linear halogen lamps measuring 118mm or 78mm.
Rect RSC	Rectangular recessed single contact
RM2P	Rim mount two pin
RSC	Recessed single contact
S	Metal sleeve
SC Bay	Single contact bayonet
SC Pf	Single contact prefocus
SFc 10-4	Sleeve with threaded pin
SFc 15, 5-6	Sleeve with threaded pin
ST	Screw terminal
TB2P	TruBeam two pin
Tf	Trufocus (also four pin)
TLMS	Tru-Loc miniature screw
2B	Two button
2PAG	Two pin all glass
2PAGC	Two pin all glass with ceramic cover
2PM	Two pin miniature
2PP	Two pin prefocus
3P	Three prong

Some of the above base styles are now obsolete. The trend in recent years has been to design newer bases to reduce waste of raw materials and simplify the replacement process.

== Standards ==
International Electrotechnical Commission (IEC)

- IEC 60061-1, Lamp caps and holders together with gauges for the control of interchangeability and safety - Part 1: Lamp caps
- IEC 60061-2, Lamp caps and holders together with gauges for the control of interchangeability and safety - Part 2: Lampholders
- IEC 60061-3, Lamp caps and holders together with gauges for the control of interchangeability and safety - Part 3: Gauges
- IEC 60061-4, Lamp caps and holders together with gauges for the control of interchangeability and safety - Part 4: Guidelines and general information

The United States standards for lamp sockets are published by ANSI and developed by NEMA, are generally harmonized with the relevant IEC standards and include:

- ANSI_IEC C78.81, American National Standard For Electric Lamps—Doublecapped Fluorescent Lamps-Dimensional and Electrical Characteristics
- ANSI_IEC C81.61, American National Standard for Electrical Lamp Bases - Specifications for Bases (Caps) for Electric Lamps
- ANSI_IEC C81.62, American National Standard for Electric Lampholders
- ANSI_IEC C81.63, American National Standard for Gauges for Electric Lamp Bases and Lampholders
- ANSI C81.64, American National Standard for Guidelines and General Information for Electric Lamp Bases, Lampholders, and Gauges

== See also ==
- List of automotive light bulb types
