= Troffer =

Type of light fixture

A troffer is a rectangular light fixture that fits into a modular dropped ceiling grid (i.e. 2' by 2' or 2' by 4'). Troffer fixtures have typically been designed to accommodate standard fluorescent lamps (T12, T8, or T5), but are now often designed with integral LED sources. Troffers are typically recessed sitting above the ceiling grid, but are also available in surface mount 'boxes'. Those with integral LEDs are often known instead as LED light panels.

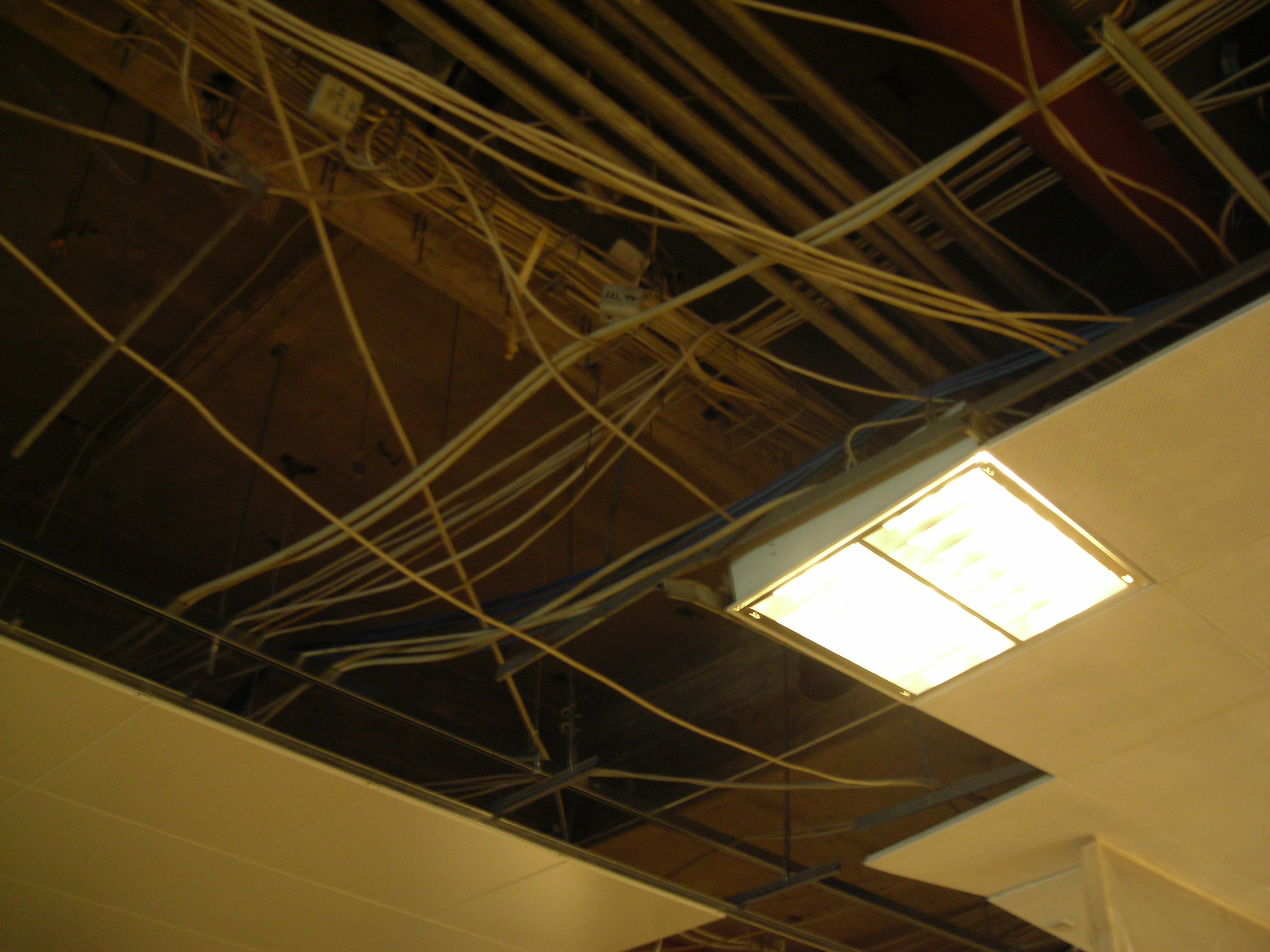
Suspended ceiling

== Use ==
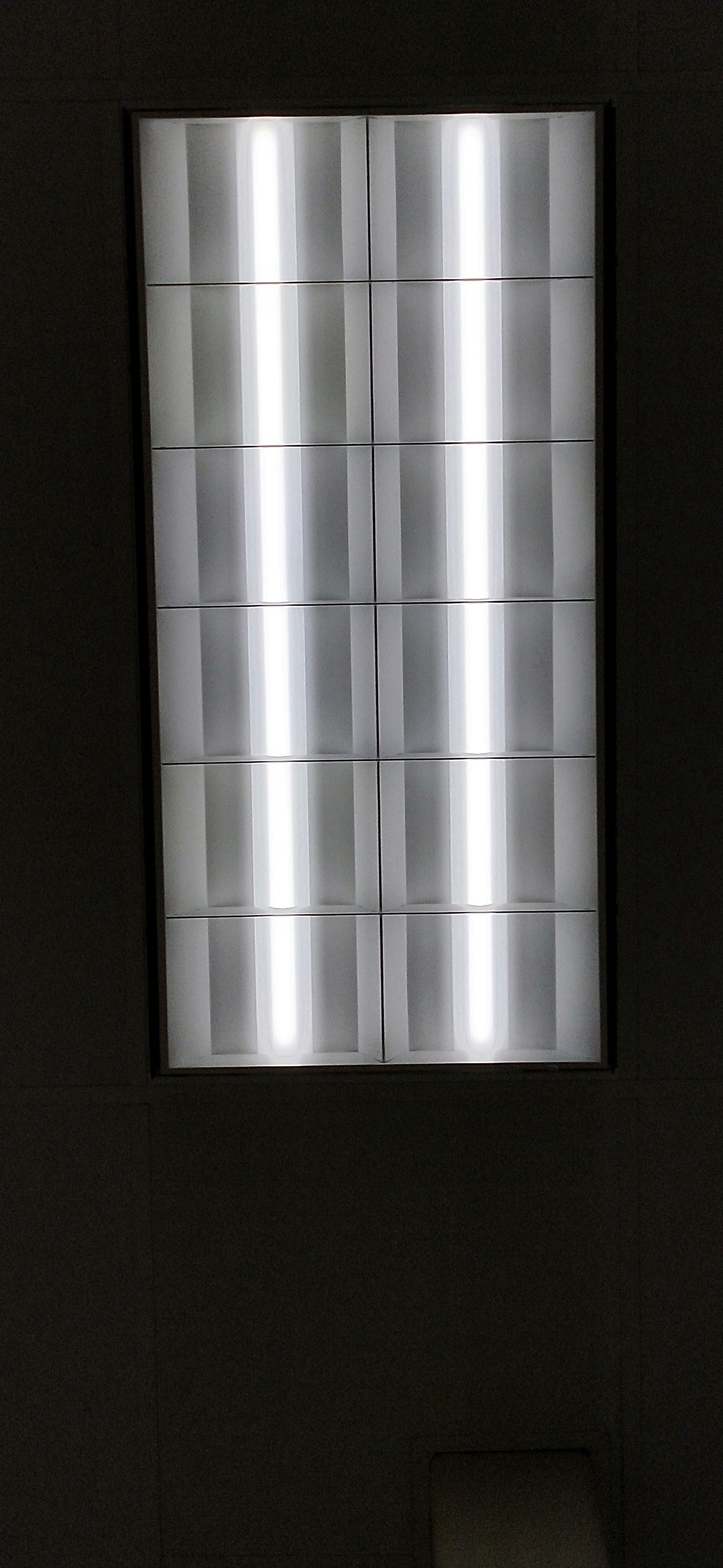
LED troffer to retrofit fluorescent troffer

The troffer is the most common type of light fixture for use in commercial office spaces, schools, hospitals and lab facilities.

== Etymology ==
The word 'troffer' is a portmanteau of 'trough' and 'coffer'.
