= Fred van der Weij =

Dutch inventor

- Born: 1962 or 1963
- Died: 2022 (aged 58-59)

Fred van der Weij (born 1962 or 1963, died 2022) was a Dutch inventor who is best known for inventing the air fryer in 2006. He went on to sell the patent to Koninklijke Philips.

Van der Weij died in 2022 of cancer.
