= Multifaceted reflector =

Light bulb

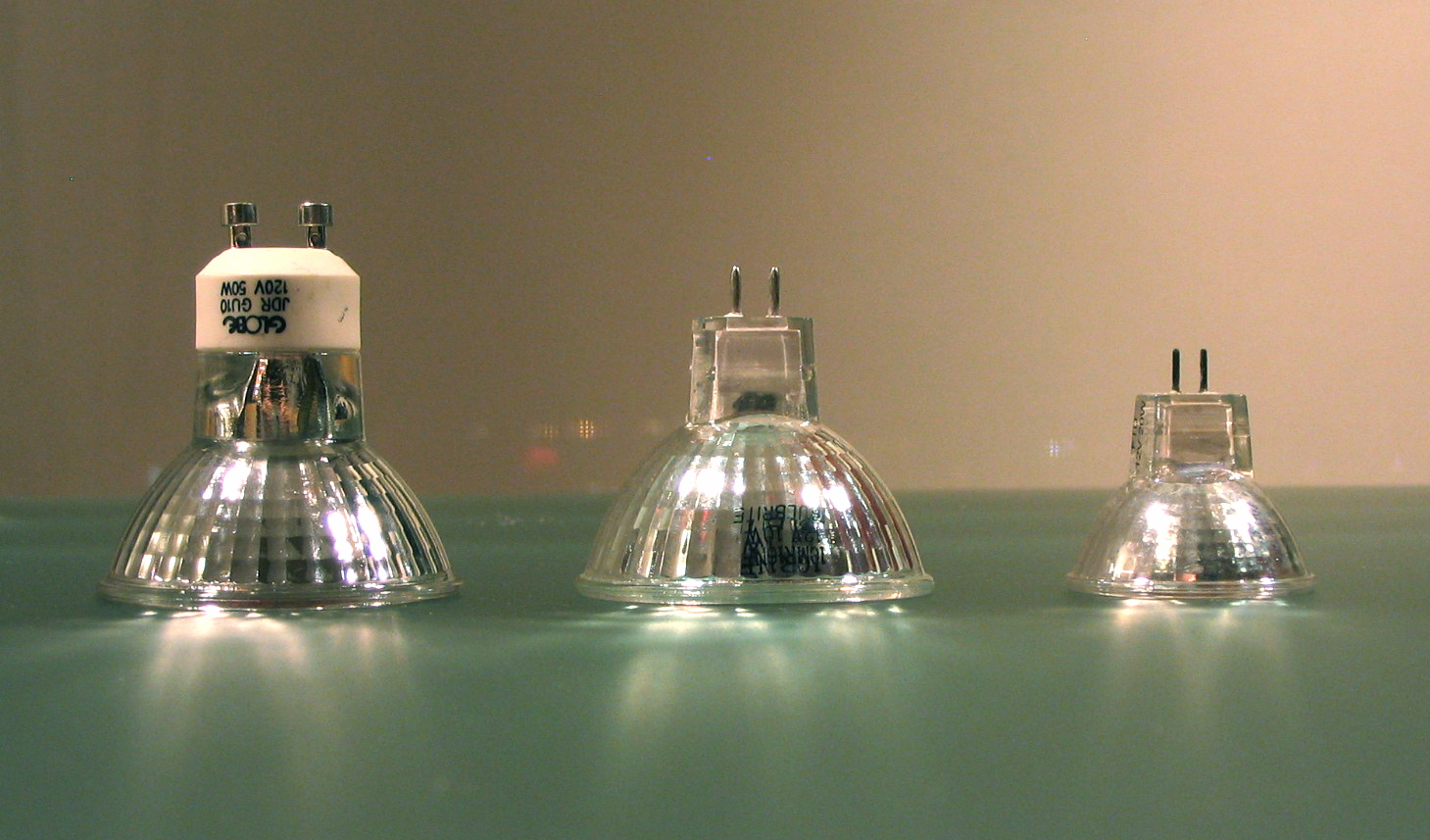
Left to right: MR16 with GU10 base, MR16 with GU5.3 base, MR11 with GU4 or GZ4 base

Line drawing of an LED MR16 lamp, with a heatsink rather than a reflector

A multifaceted reflector (often abbreviated MR) light bulb is a reflector housing format for halogen and LED lamps. MR lamps were originally designed for use in slide projectors, but see use in residential lighting and retail lighting as well. They are suited to applications that require directional lighting such as track lighting, recessed ceiling lights, desk lamps, pendant fixtures, landscape lighting, retail display lighting, and bicycle headlights. MR lamps are designated by symbols such as MR16 where the diameter is represented by numerals indicating units of eighths of an inch. Common sizes for general lighting are MR11 (11/8 inches, 35 mm) and MR16 (16/8 inches, 51 mm), with MR8 (8/8 inch, 25 mm) and MR20 (20/8 inches, 64 mm) used in specialty applications. Many run on low voltage rather than mains voltage alternating current so require a power supply.

== History ==
The MR16 lamp was first sold in 1965. Emmett H. Wiley of General Electric was awarded patent #3,314,331 for a miniature reflector lamp in 1967. The innovation was using the lamp rim, rather than the base, as the reference plane for focusing. This allowed more flexible electrical mounting arrangements and more precise focusing. Wiley's initial design had a smooth reflector; multifaceted reflectors were introduced by others in 1971.

== Characteristics ==
=== Design and construction ===
Most MR lamps consist of a halogen capsule (or, bulb) integrated with a pressed glass reflector with a base conforming to bi-pin GU5.3 standard. The compact size of the MR base allows for much smaller, more discreet fixtures than the incandescent reflector bulbs that pre-dated MRs.

The reflector controls the direction and spread of light cast from the lamp. MR lamps are available with different beam angles from narrow spot lights of as small as 7° to wide flood lamps of 60°.

=== Dichroic reflectors ===
Some lamps use an aluminum coating as a reflector. Others use selective dichroic coating that reflects visible light and allows infrared radiation to pass through. This type reduces heating of illuminated objects since less infrared radiation is present in the light beam. However, dichroic lamps must only be used in compatible fixtures that can dissipate the heat.

IEC 60598 No Cool Beam symbol

Dichroic lamps must not be fitted to recessed or enclosed luminaires with the IEC 60598 No Cool Beam symbol (a "cool beam" is accomplished by allowing the infrared heat to pass backward through the dichroic reflector and into the luminary fixture).

=== Operation ===
The brightness of MR lamps can be adjusted when used with appropriate light fixtures and dimmers. However, the color temperature changes significantly when the lamp is dimmed, shifting dramatically to the warmer end of the spectrum.

Halogen lamps (18 lm/W typical) are more energy efficient than regular incandescent lamps (15 lm/W typical) but still fall far behind other more-recent types such as fluorescent lamps (80–100 lm/W), gas discharge lamps (100–200 lm/W depending on types), and LEDs (125–150 lm/W typical in bright white depending on style).

With both types of incandescent bulbs, useful life can be considerably shortened if their filaments experience mechanical shock or vibration. Using an electronic transformer with a soft start feature can considerably extend life, as it reduces the characteristically high inrush current that occurs initially when the lamp is cold. Dimming also extends life significantly.

MR lamps, like all quartz-halogen lamps, produce some undesirable ultraviolet light. Usually, this must be filtered out. Also, the quartz capsules of the lamps may rupture or explode upon failure of the lamps. For these two reasons, some MR lamps include a cover glass that serves as an integrated ultraviolet filter and explosion shield. MR16 lamps lacking this cover require the use of a fixture that incorporates an external piece of glass specifically designed to provide both ultraviolet and physical protection.

MR lamps are available in 10–75 watt power ratings (150–800 lumens).

== Variations ==
MR lamps most often operate at 12 volts, although they are also available in other voltages. These lamps use a bi-pin connector for power: 12-volt MR11 bulbs usually use a GU4 base, and 12-volt MR16 bulbs usually use a GU5.3 base. The common 12-volt MR16 lamps, therefore, require a ferromagnetic or electronic transformer—sometimes misnamed as a ballast—to convert the 120- or 230-volt mains voltage to the extra-low voltage required by the lamp.

Certain MR lamps can operate directly on the mains voltage. These lamps typically use a GU10 turn-and-lock base, so they cannot be accidentally interchanged with low-voltage lamps. GU10 is distinguished from the lower-voltage MR lamps by the U-shaped ceramic base mount with a 10 mm (pin center-to-center distance) 2-pin bayonet mount. MR16 lamps with an integrated transformer are also available. These lamps have screw bases to fit standard medium-base Edison sockets.

MR lamps are commonly available in range of color temperatures, from about 2700 K to 7000 K, to satisfy various applications.

=== Alternatives ===
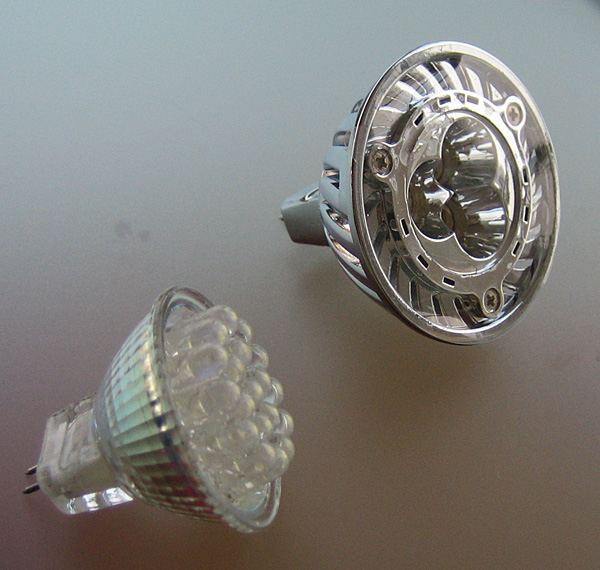
LED MR11, 70 lm/W LED MR16

Retrofit lamps that generate light by a different principle but uses the MR form-factor are available.

For example, LED-based MR16 lamps appear similar to halogen lamps and can be used in most fixtures designed for MR lamps. The same is true of MR11-compatible LED lamps. Fixtures designed for halogen MR16 or MR11 lamps that use electronic transformers may need to be retrofitted with LED-compatible transformers. There is a wide variety of designs, varying significantly with regard to beam width, light colour, efficiency and luminous power.

Unlike halogen MRs, LED-lamps often do not have the multifaceted reflectors that give MRs their precise beam width control. Some rely on the optics of the LED(s) to control the beam width. Some designs may have simple cut-off apertures that limit beam width, or even individual reflectors or lenses for each LED.

As with other LED lamps available today, the quality and color temperature of the white light produced by such lamps varies. The least efficient of these lamps produce about 26 lumens per watt (lm/W), which is similar to the efficiency of halogen MRs. The most efficient of these lamps available today produce about 160 lm/W, which exceeds the efficiency of compact fluorescent lamps.

In terms of total luminous power, such lamps range from being significantly less powerful than their halogen counterparts, to being comparable to the lower power halogen MR16s. The brightest available halogen MR16s are still slightly brighter than the brightest available LED versions.

== Advantages ==
MR lamps offer several advantages over other lamps with equivalent power ratings. They are typically smaller (transformers excepted), provide better beam control and offer a whiter light than ordinary incandescent lamps. The small size of the lamp allows designers more flexibility in placing the lamps and with the option of various beam widths, the light beam can be very specifically placed.

White LED MR lamps can be manufactured with different colour temperatures, normally ranging from warm whites, attempting to match the colour of halogens, all the way through to cool whites at 5500 K or more.

Another advantage is when used in 12-volt track lighting systems the bare wires/connectors can be touched without fear of electrocution.

== Disadvantages ==
MR lamps have several disadvantages over other types of lighting, most notably their high operating temperature and the risks of explosion from their pressurized bulb. The halogen bulb can reach temperatures over 200 °C (392 °F), increasing the risk of fire should anything flammable come in contact or even be in close proximity to the bulb or fixture. The quartz capsule containing the filament and halogen gas is pressurized and can explode if improperly handled or damaged, and must be handled carefully prior to installation to prevent contamination with oil and salt from fingerprints, which can dramatically shorten the lamp's life.

== ANSI designations ==
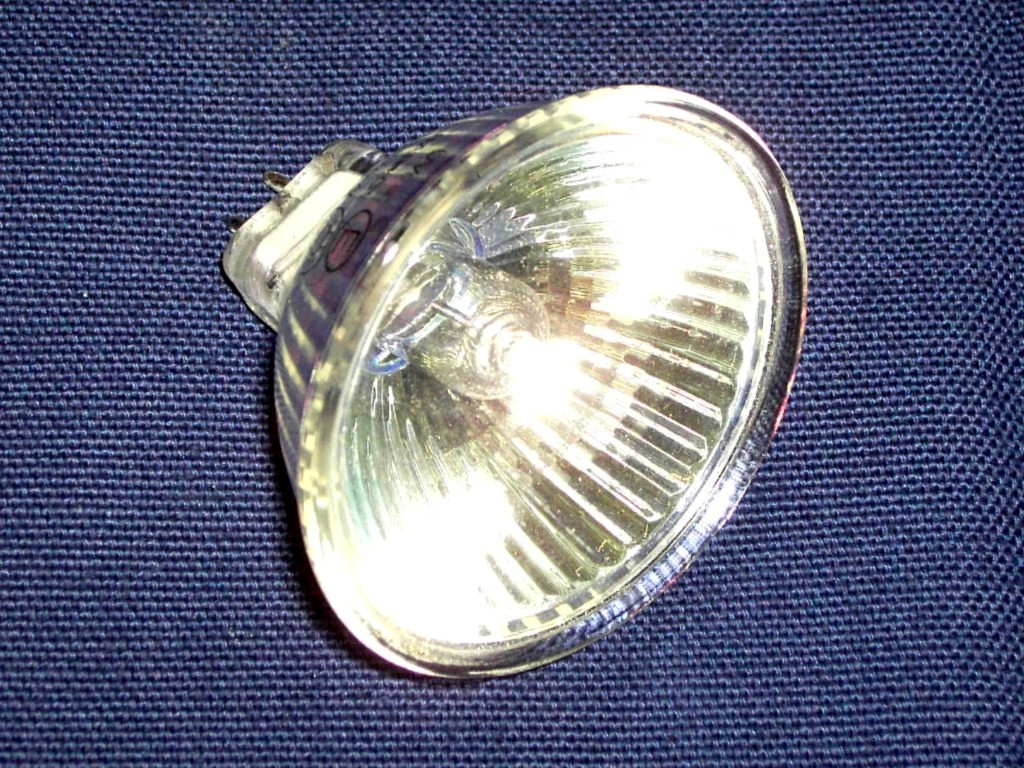
A typical MR16 lamp

The following ANSI standard codes are used to designate certain power and beam angle combinations for MR16 lamps. Many manufacturers use these standard codes for lamps matching these specifications:

ANSI code	Power (W)	Volts	Beam angle	Designation
ESX	20		10°	20MR16/10°
BAB	20		40°	20MR16/40°
FMV	35		25°	35MR16/25°
FMW	35		35°	35MR16/35°
EXT	50		15°	50MR16/15°
EXZ	50		25°	50MR16/25°
EXN	50		40°	50MR16/40°
FNV	50		60°	50MR16/60°
FPA	65		15°	65MR16/15°
FPC	65		25°	65MR16/25°
FPB	65		40°	65MR16/40°
EYF	75		15°	75MR16/15°
EYJ	75		25°	75MR16/25°
EYC	75		40°	75MR16/40°

Note that MR lamps are available in power and beam combinations other than those listed above. For this reason, MR lamps are also often labeled according to beam spread abbreviations. Note that these while these abbreviations are commonly used, the angles associated with these abbreviations vary slightly from manufacturer to manufacturer. Typical beam angles for these beam spread abbreviations are as follows:

Name		Beam angle
Narrow spot	NS	5–15°
Spot	S	16–22°
Narrow flood	NF	23–32°
Flood	FL	33–45°
Wide flood	WF	46–74°
Very wide flood	VW	≥75°

== See also ==
- Bayonet mount – Fastening mechanism
- Bi-pin connector – Type of lamp/lightbulb fitting/connector
- Edison screw – Lightbulb socket standard (E5-E40)
- Luminous efficacy – How efficiently a source produces visible light
- Luminous flux – Perceived luminous power
