= Convection oven =

Appliance that heats food

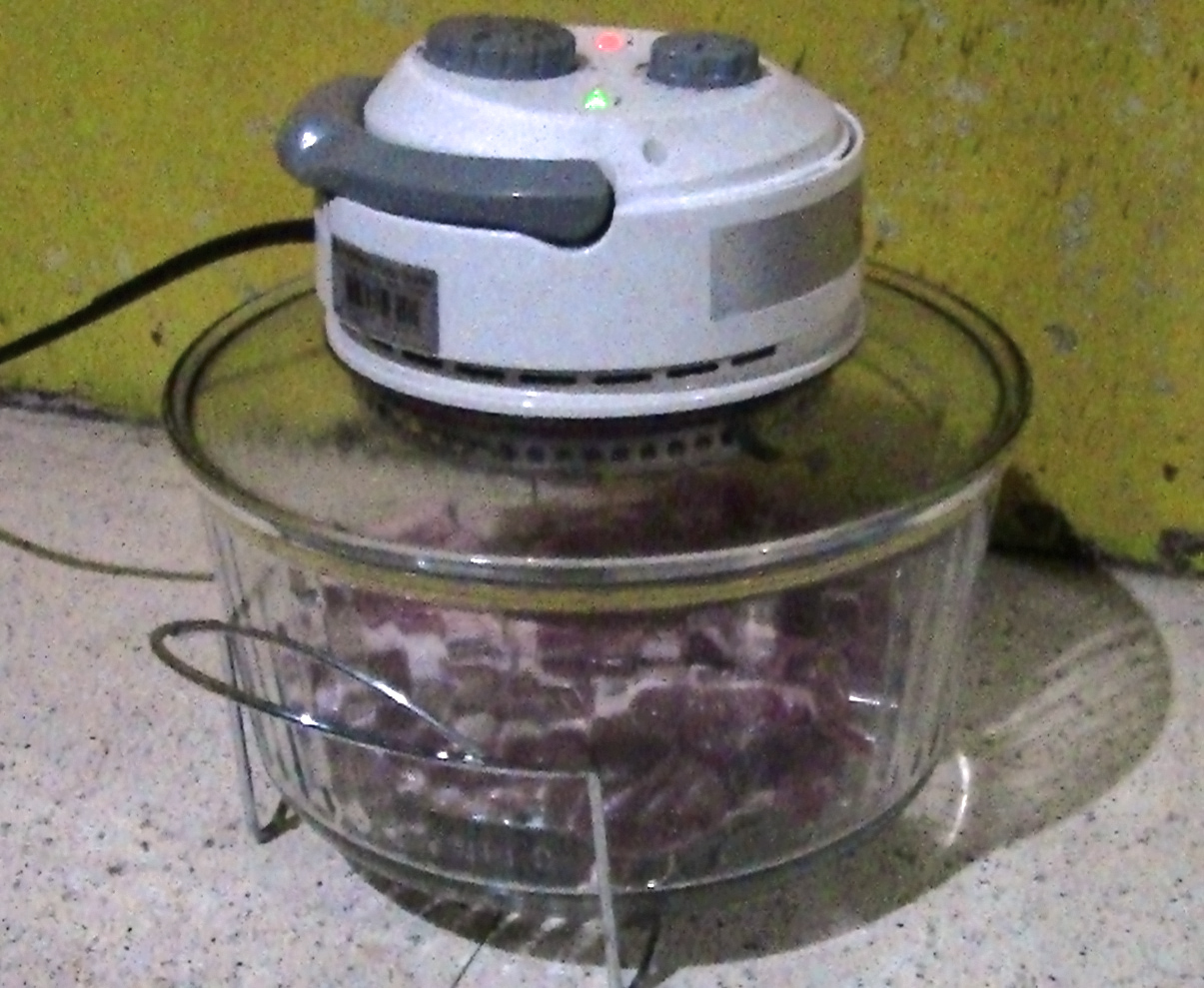
A tabletop convection oven cooking pork. For slower cooking, the gridiron here has been reversed to place the meat low and far from the main heat source (at the top of the pot), although near the heat of the glass pot's bottom. Flipping the gridiron would raise the meat closer to the main heat source.

A convection oven (also known as a fan-assisted oven, turbo broiler or simply a fan oven or turbo) is an oven that has fans to circulate air around food to create an evenly heated environment. In an oven without a fan, natural convection circulates hot air unevenly, so that it will be cooler at the bottom and hotter at the top than in the middle. Fan ovens cook food faster, and are also used in non-food, industrial applications. Small countertop convection ovens for household use are often marketed as air fryers.

When cooking using a fan-assisted oven, the temperature is usually set lower than for a non-fan oven, often by 20 °C (36 °F), to avoid overcooking the outside of the food.

== Principle of operation ==
Convection ovens distribute heat evenly around the food, removing the blanket of cooler air that surrounds food when it is first placed in an oven and allowing food to cook more evenly in less time and at a lower temperature than in a conventional oven.

== History ==
The first oven with a fan to circulate air was invented in 1914 but it was never launched commercially.

The first convection oven in wide use was the Maxson Whirlwind Oven, introduced in 1945.

Convection ovens have been in wide use since 1945.

In 2006, Groupe SEB introduced the world's first air fryer, under the Actifry brand of convection ovens in the French market.

In 2010, Philips introduced the Airfryer brand of convection oven at the IFA Berlin consumer electronics fair. By 2018, the term "air fryer" was starting to be used generically.

In the United States convection ovens experienced a surge in popularity in the late 2010s and early 2020s with a reported 36% of US households having one in 2020 and an estimated 60% of US households having one in 2023. Food manufacturers have responded by adding air frying instructions on a number of products and pre air-fried products also coming to market.

In the UK, air fryers have surged in popularity since the early 2020s, with a 2024 study claiming that 1 in 5 Britons surveyed said that air fryers are their most commonly used cooking device.

== Design ==
A convection oven has a fan with a heating element around it. A small fan circulates the air in the cooking chamber.

One effect of the fan is to reduce the thickness of the stationary thermal boundary layer of cooler air that naturally forms around the food. The boundary layer acts as an insulator and slows the rate at which heat is transferred to the food. By moving the cool air (convecting it) away from the food the layer is thinned, and cooking is faster. To prevent overcooking before the middle is cooked, the temperature is usually reduced by about 20 °C (36 °F) below the setting used for a non-fan oven. In a non-fan oven the temperature varies significantly in different places; a fan distributes hot air evenly for a uniform temperature.

Convection ovens may include additional radiant heat sources at the top and bottom of the oven, which provide immediate heat without the warmup time of a (natural or fan-assisted) convection oven.

== Effectiveness ==
A convection oven allows a reduction in cooking temperature compared to a conventional oven. This comparison will vary, depending on factors including, for example, how much food is being cooked at once or if airflow is being restricted, for example by an oversized baking tray. This difference in cooking temperature is offset as the circulating air transfers heat more quickly than still air of the same temperature. In order to transfer the same amount of heat in the same time, the temperature must be lowered to reduce the rate of heat transfer in order to compensate.

== Industrial convection ovens ==
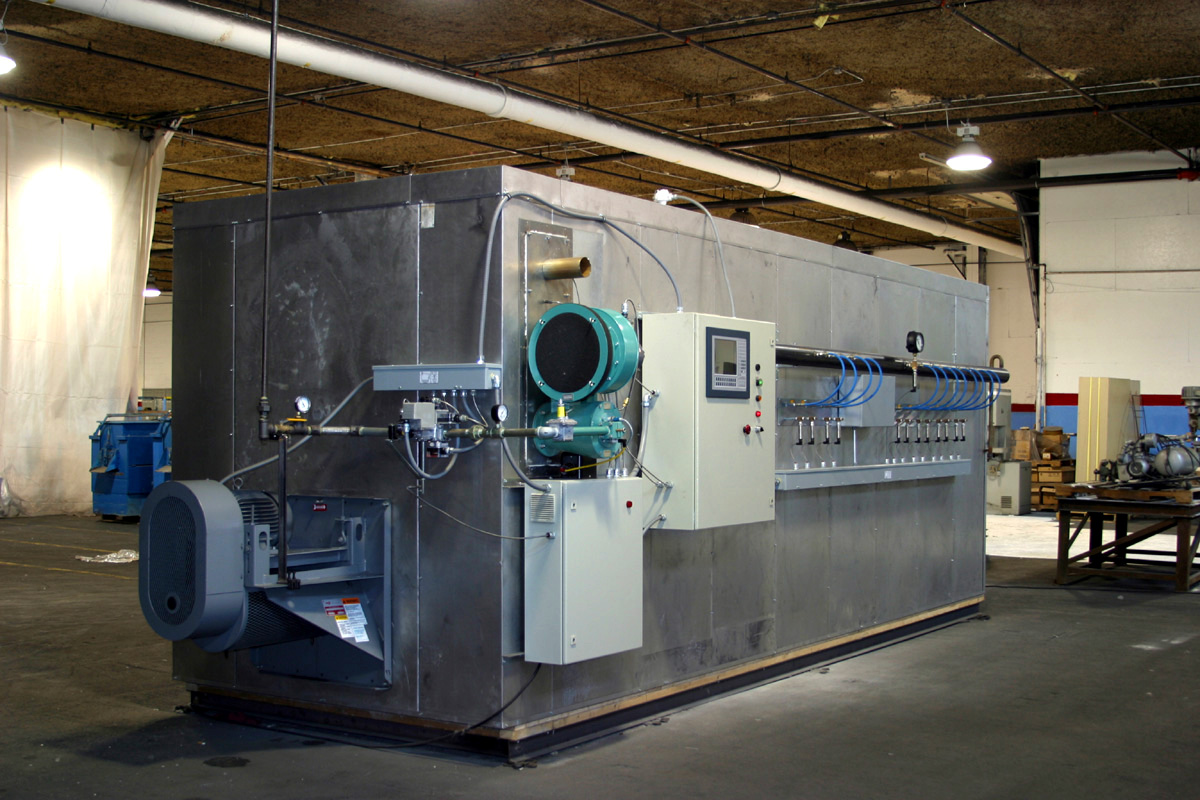
An industrial convection oven used in the aircraft manufacturing industry

Hot air ovens are convection ovens used to sterilize medical equipment.

== Variants ==
Another form of convection oven has hot air directed at a high flow rate from above and below food that passes through the oven on a conveyor belt; it is called an impingement oven. This cooks, for example, breaded products such as chicken nuggets or breaded chicken portions faster than a fan oven, and yields a crisp surface texture. Impinged air also prevents "shadowing" which occurs with infrared radiant heat sources. Impingement ovens can achieve a much higher heat transfer than a conventional oven.

Fully enclosed models can also use dual magnetrons, as used by microwave ovens. The most notable manufacturer of this type of oven is TurboChef. The differences between an impingement oven with magnetrons and a convection microwave oven are claimed to be cost, power consumption, and speed. Impingement ovens are designed to be used in restaurants, where speed is essential and power consumption and cost are less of a concern.

There are also convection microwave ovens which combine a convection oven with a microwave oven to cook food with the speed of a microwave oven and the browning ability of a convection oven.

A combi steamer is an oven that combines convection functionality with superheated steam to cook foods even faster and retain more nutrients and moisture.

== Air fryer ==
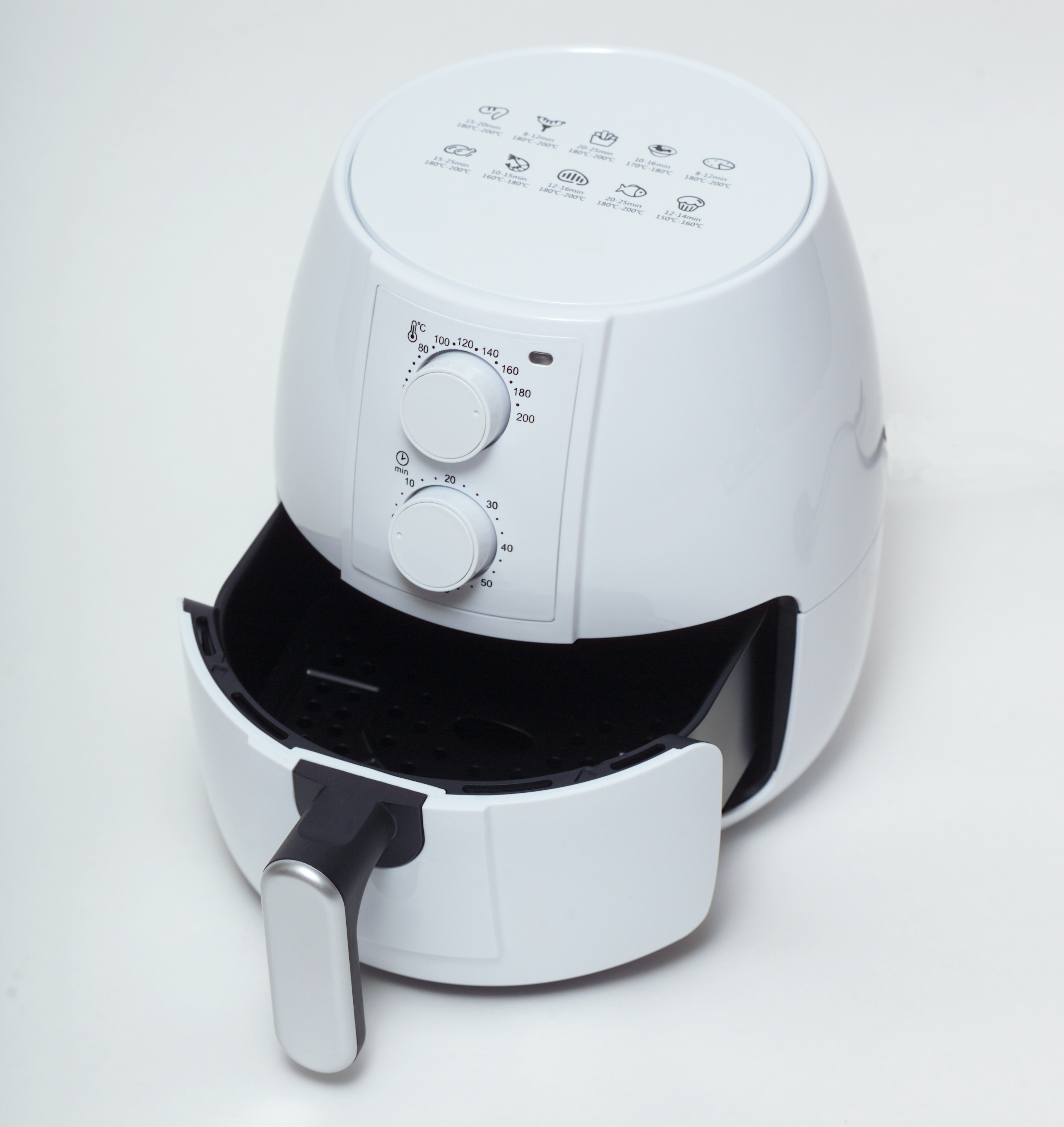
An air fryer

An air fryer is a small countertop convection oven that produces cooking temperatures similar to those of deep frying without submerging the food in oil. Conventional frying methods induce the Maillard and other browning reactions at temperatures of 140 to 165 °C (284 to 329 °F) by completely submerging foods in hot oil, well above the boiling point of water. The air fryer works by circulating air at up to 200 °C (392 °F) to apply sufficient heat to food coated with a thin layer of oil, causing the reaction. A fan circulates hot air at a high speed, producing a crisp layer via browning reactions. Most air fryers have temperature and timer adjustments that allow precise cooking. Food is typically cooked in a basket that sits on a drip tray. For best results with food in small pieces the basket must be periodically agitated, either manually or by the fryer mechanism.

=== Comparison with conventional convection oven ===
Convection ovens and air fryers are similar in the way they cook food, but air fryers are smaller and give off less heat to the room. Some product reviewers find that regular convection ovens or convection toaster ovens produce better results; others say that air frying is essentially the same as convection baking, while still others praise the devices for cooking faster, being easier to clean, and making it easier to produce crispy results than full size convection ovens.

=== Types of household air fryers ===
Paddle
In this type, a paddle in the heating chamber continually moves the pieces of food to ensure even distribution of hot air. Fryers without paddles require manual stirring to achieve the same effect.
Cylindrical basket
A small, single-function air fryer with a drawer containing a removable perforated cylindrical basket. A fan blows hot air from the top. Typically with a volume of up to 2.8 liters (3.0 U.S. quarts). Being small, it preheats faster than other types of air fryer.
Countertop convection oven
some countertop convection ovens incorporate an air-frying feature that works in the same way as basket-type air fryers. They usually have multiple trays or racks, so multiple dishes can be cooked at the same time. They have a typical volume of about 24 liters (25 U.S. quarts). They are more versatile than single-function ovens because they have multiple features such as baking, rotisserie, grilling, frying, broiling, and toasting.
Halogen
This type of air fryer cooks food with a halogen radiant heat source from above. Hot air is circulated by a fan as in other types of air fryer. This type is usually a large glass bowl with a hinged lid.
Oil-less turkey fryer
This is a large, barrel-shaped air fryer used to cook whole turkeys and other large pieces of meat. It circulates air around the drum to cook the meat evenly.

=== History ===
The air fryer was invented in 2006 by Dutch engineer Fred van der Weij. Four years after inventing it, van der Weij took his invention to Philips, who launched the Airfryer in 2010. Philips gave the name Rapid Air technology to the RUSH (Radiant and UpStream Heating) technology developed by APDS Development during the development of the Airfryer. The technique was patented as Rapid Air technology.

The original Philips Airfryer used radiant heat from a heating element just above the food and convection heat from a strong hot air stream blown downwards over the food to the bottom, then deflected back upwards by the shaped bottom of the chamber, thus delivering heat from all sides using a relatively small volume of hot air forced to pass from the heater surface and over the food, with no idle air circulating as in a convection oven.
