= Bipin Adhikari =

Nepali constitutional law expert

Bipin Adhikari is a Nepalese constitutional law expert and a professor of law at Kathmandu University School of Law. Adhikari has written and edited various articles and books on constitutional law, human rights, and the rule of law. Adhikari is also recognized as a public intellectual.

== Life and education ==
Adhikari was born in Bastipur in the Lahan Municipality of the Madhesh Province of Nepal. He graduated from Tribhuvan University in Kathmandu in 1985 with a Bachelor of Law. Adhikari earned a Master of Comparative Law, with a focus on corporate management and law, from the Faculty of Law, University of Delhi in 1991 and then went on to earn a PhD in constitutional law in 2001. Prior to being awarded his PhD, Adhikari received the Chevening Scholarship at Lancaster University in the United Kingdom, where he studied international business and finance law.

== Career ==
=== Constitutional law ===
Adhikari contributed as an independent constitutional expert from civil society in the drafting of the Constitution of Nepal through Constituent Assembly I and II between 2008 and 2015. In 2009, he was among the few experts who presented a model constitution to the Constituent Assembly of Nepal following the Nepalese Civil War. He frequently opines on constitutional issues of the day, including citizenship, constitutional role of the president and prime minister, and government formation.

Adhikari is a Senior Advocate of the Supreme Court Bar Association and a member of the Constitution Watch Group, a network of independent experts committed to the Constitution of Nepal and its institutionalization. He is also a board member of the University of Nepal's Board of Trustees.

=== Kathmandu University School of Law ===
In December 2013, Adhikari established the School of Law as the seventh school at Kathmandu University, a non-governmental public university. The School of Law focused on four interdisciplinary programs at the intersection of law, economics, and management.

=== United Nations ===
Adhikari has worked for various United Nations entities: United Nations Office for Project Services (UNOPS), the Office of the United Nations High Commissioner for Human Rights (OHCHR), the United Nations Development Programme (UNDP), and the United Nations peacekeeping missions.

== Publications ==
- Citizen Engagement in Lawmaking International Trends and Nepalese Scenario, 2020.
- Salient Features of the Constitution of Nepal, 2015.
- World Heritage and Human Rights: Lessons from the Asia-Pacific and global arena (Earthscan Routledge, 2018)
- Building Capacity of National Human Rights Institutions: The Case of Nepal, 2004.
