= Halogen lamp =

Incandescent lamp variety

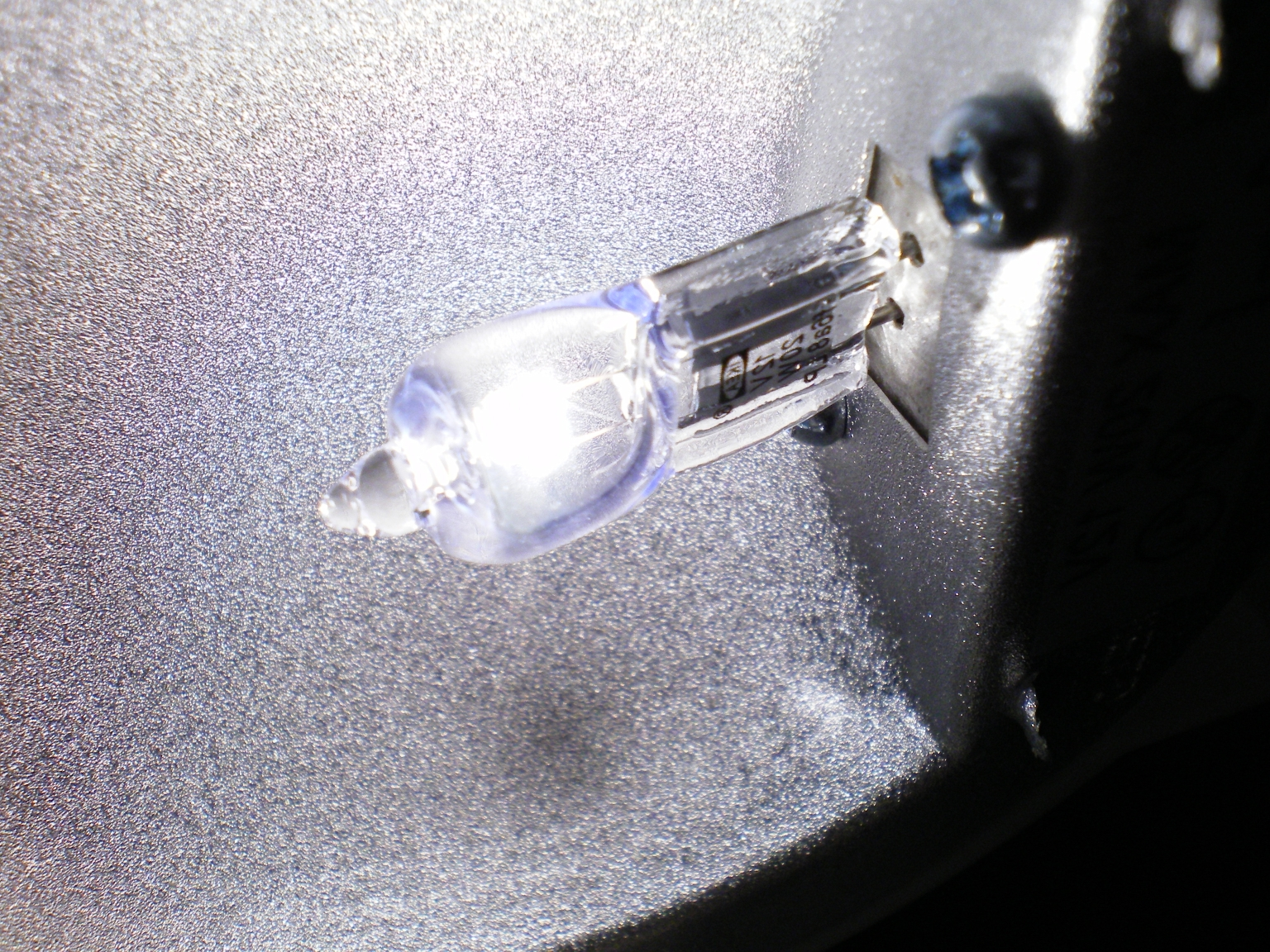
A halogen lamp operating in its fitting with the protective glass removed

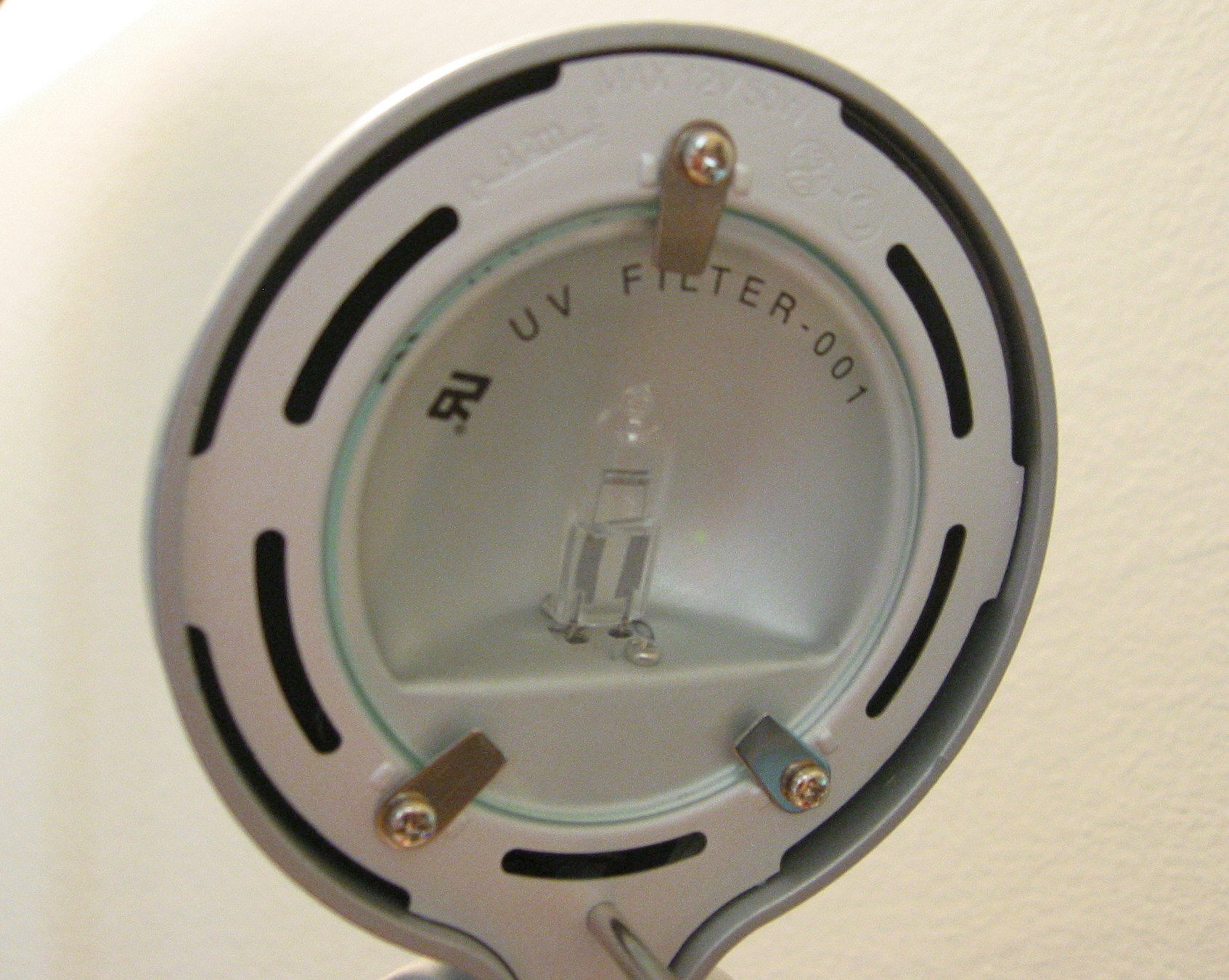
A halogen lamp behind a round UV filter. A separate filter is included with some halogen light fixtures to remove UV light.

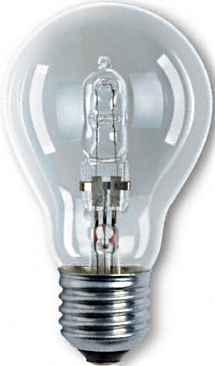
Halogen lamp (105 W) for replacement purposes with an E27 screw base

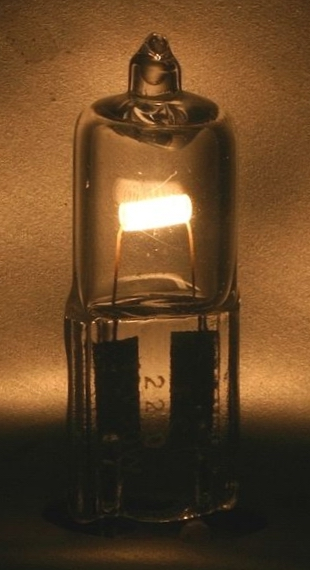
A close-up of a halogen lamp capsule

A halogen lamp (also called tungsten halogen, quartz-halogen, and quartz iodine lamp) is an incandescent lamp consisting of a tungsten filament sealed in a compact transparent envelope that is filled with a mixture of an inert gas and a small amount of a halogen, such as iodine or bromine. The combination of the halogen gas and the tungsten filament produces a halogen-cycle chemical reaction, which redeposits evaporated tungsten on the filament, increasing its life and maintaining the clarity of the envelope. This allows the filament to operate at a higher temperature than a standard incandescent lamp of similar power and operating life; this also produces light with higher luminous efficacy and color temperature. The small size of halogen lamps permits their use in compact optical systems for projectors and illumination. The small glass envelope may be enclosed in a much larger outer glass bulb, which has a lower temperature, protects the inner bulb from contamination, and makes the bulb mechanically more similar to a conventional lamp.

Standard and halogen incandescent bulbs are much less efficient than LED and compact fluorescent lamps, and therefore have been or are being banned in many places.

== History ==
A carbon filament lamp using chlorine to prevent darkening of the envelope was patented by Edward Scribner of the US Electric Lighting Co. in 1882, and chlorine-filled "NoVak" lamps were marketed in 1892.

The use of iodine was proposed in a 1933 patent which also described the cyclic redeposition of tungsten back onto the filament. In 1959, General Electric patented a practical lamp using iodine.

=== Bans ===
In 2009, the EU and other European countries began to ban incandescent light bulbs. The production and importation of directional mains-voltage halogen bulbs was banned on 1 September 2016, and non-directional halogen bulbs followed on 1 September 2018. Australia banned some halogen light bulbs above 10W from September 2021 in favour of eco-halogen bulbs, later than the planned date of September 2020 to keep the policy in line with the European Union. In June 2021, the UK government also announced plans to end the sale of halogen light bulbs from September, as part of the UK's wider efforts to tackle climate change.

== Halogen cycle ==
In ordinary incandescent lamps, evaporated tungsten mostly deposits onto the inner surface of the bulb, causing the bulb to blacken and the filament to grow increasingly weak until it eventually breaks. The presence of the halogen, however, sets up a reversible chemical reaction cycle with this evaporated tungsten. The halogen cycle keeps the bulb clean and causes the light output to remain almost constant throughout the bulb's life. At moderate temperatures, the halogen reacts with the evaporating tungsten, the halide formed being moved around in the inert gas filling. At some point, however, it will reach higher temperature regions within the bulb where it then dissociates, releasing tungsten back onto the filament and freeing the halogen to repeat the process. However, the overall bulb envelope temperature must be significantly higher than in conventional incandescent lamps for this reaction to succeed: it is only at temperatures of above 250 °C (482 °F) on the inside of the glass envelope that the halogen vapor can combine with the tungsten and return it to the filament rather than the tungsten becoming deposited on the glass. A 300-watt tubular halogen bulb operated at full power quickly reaches a temperature of about 540 °C (1,004 °F), while a 500-watt regular incandescent bulb operates at only 180 °C (356 °F) and a 75-watt regular incandescent at only 130 °C (266 °F).

The bulb must be made of fused silica (quartz) or a high-melting-point glass (such as aluminosilicate glass). Since quartz is very strong, the gas pressure can be higher which reduces the rate of evaporation of the filament, permitting it to run a higher temperature (and so luminous efficacy) for the same average life. The tungsten released in hotter regions does not generally redeposit where it came from, so the hotter parts of the filament eventually thin out and fail.

Quartz iodine lamps, using elemental iodine, were the first commercial halogen lamps launched by GE in 1959. Quite soon, bromine was found to have advantages, but was not used in elemental form. Certain hydrocarbon bromine compounds gave good results. Regeneration of the filament is also possible with fluorine, but its chemical reactivity is so great that other parts of the lamp are attacked. The halogen is normally mixed with a noble gas, often krypton or xenon. The first lamps used only tungsten for filament supports, but some designs use molybdenum – an example being the molybdenum shield in the H4 twin filament headlight for the European Asymmetric Passing Beam.

For a fixed power and life, the luminous efficacy of all incandescent lamps is greatest at a particular design voltage. Halogen lamps made for 12 to 24 volt operation have good light outputs, and the very compact filaments are particularly beneficial for optical control (see picture). The ranges of multifaceted reflector "MR" lamps of 20–50 watts were originally conceived for the projection of 8 mm film, but are now widely used for display lighting and in the home. More recently, wider beam versions have become available, designed for direct use on supply voltages of 120 or 230 V.

== Effect of voltage on performance ==
Tungsten halogen lamps behave similarly to other incandescent lamps when run on a different voltage. However, the light output is reported as proportional to$V^3$, and the luminous efficacy is proportional to$V^{1.3}$. The normal relationship regarding the lifetime is that it is proportional to$V^{-14}$. For example, a bulb operated at 5% higher than its design voltage would produce about 15% more light, and the luminous efficacy would be about 6.5% higher, but would be expected to have only half the rated life.

Halogen lamps are manufactured with enough halogen to match the rate of tungsten evaporation at their design voltage. Increasing the applied voltage increases the rate of evaporation, so at some point, there may be insufficient halogen, and the lamp goes black. Over-voltage operation is not generally recommended. With a reduced voltage, the evaporation is lower, and there may be too much halogen, which can lead to abnormal failure. At much lower voltages, the bulb temperature may be too low to support the halogen cycle, but by this time, the evaporation rate is too low for the bulb to blacken significantly. If the bulbs do blacken, it is recommended to run the lamps at the rated voltage to restart the cycle. There are many situations where halogen lamps are dimmed successfully. However, lamp life may not be extended as much as predicted. The life span of dimming depends on lamp construction, the halogen additive used, and whether dimming is normally expected for this type.

== Spectrum ==
Power of a halogen light as a function of wavelength. The colored band indicates the visible light spectrum. Note that this spectrum is distorted by the responsivity of the optical detector used in the measurement, greatly reducing the apparent power in the infrared.

Like all incandescent light bulbs, a halogen lamp produces a continuous spectrum of light, from near ultraviolet to deep into the infrared. Since the lamp filament can operate at a higher temperature than a non-halogen lamp, the spectrum is shifted toward blue, producing light with a higher effective color temperature and higher power efficiency.

High-temperature filaments emit some energy in the UV region. Small amounts of other elements can be mixed into the quartz, so that the doped quartz (or selective optical coating) blocks harmful UV radiation. Hard glass blocks UV and has been used extensively for the bulbs of car headlights. Alternatively, the halogen lamp can be mounted inside an outer bulb, similar to an ordinary incandescent lamp, which also reduces the risks from the high bulb temperature. Undoped quartz halogen lamps are used in some scientific, medical, and dental instruments as a UV-B source.

== Safety ==
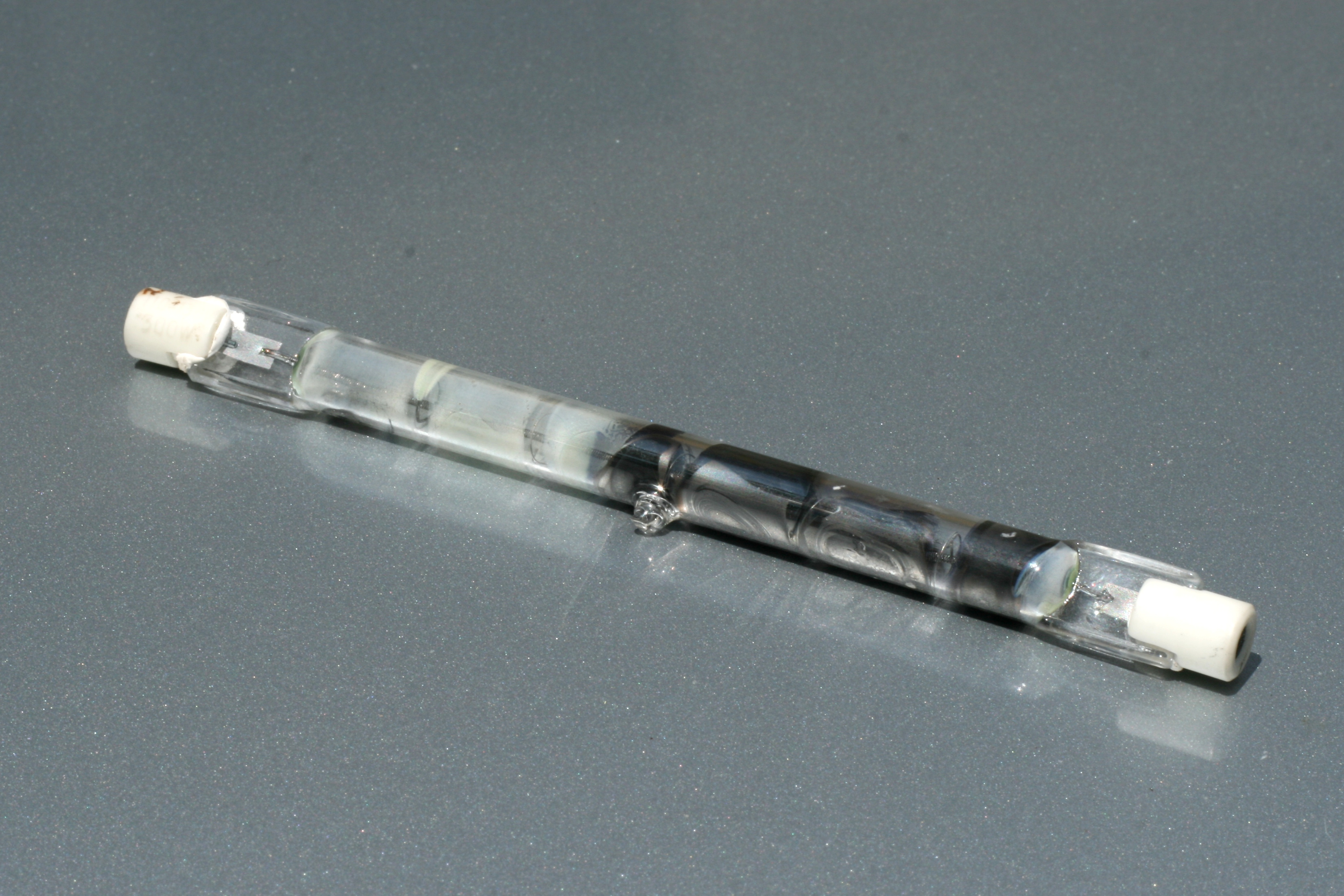
A burned-out R7S form factor halogen lamp

Halogen lamps must run at much higher temperatures than regular incandescent lamps for proper operation. Their small size helps to concentrate the heat on a smaller envelope surface, closer to the filament than a non-halogen incandescent. Because of the very high temperatures, halogen lamps can pose fire and burn hazards. In Australia, numerous house fires each year are attributed to ceiling-mounted halogen downlights. The Western Australia Department of Fire and Emergency Services recommends that homeowners consider instead using cooler-running compact fluorescent lamps or light-emitting diode lamps. Halogen Torchère floor lamps have been banned in some places, such as dormitories, because of the large number of fires they have caused. They were held responsible by the United States Consumer Product Safety Commission for 100 fires and 10 deaths between 1992 and 1997. Halogen bulbs operate at high temperatures, and the tall height of the lamps can bring them near flammable materials, such as curtains. Some safety codes require halogen bulbs to be protected by a grid or grille, especially for high-power (1–2 kW) bulbs used in theatre, or by the glass and metal housing of the fixture, to prevent ignition of draperies or flammable objects in contact with the lamp. To reduce unintentional ultraviolet (UV) exposure and to contain hot bulb fragments in the event of explosive bulb failure, general-purpose lamps usually have a UV-absorbing glass filter over or around the bulb. Alternatively, lamp bulbs may be doped or coated to filter out the UV radiation. With adequate filtering, a halogen lamp exposes users to less UV than a standard incandescent lamp producing the same effective level of illumination without filtering.

Any surface contamination, notably the oil from human fingertips or any uneven coating of dust or other substance, can damage the quartz envelope when it is heated. Because contaminants absorb more light and heat than the glass does, they will create a hot spot on the bulb surface when the lamp is turned on. This extreme, localized heat causes the quartz to change from its vitreous form into a weaker, crystalline form that leaks gas. This weakening may also cause the bulb to form a bubble, weakening it and leading to its explosion and glass shrapnel.

The small glass envelope may be enclosed in a much larger outer glass bulb, which provides several advantages if a small size is not required:

- The outer jacket will be at a much lower, safer temperature, protecting objects or people that might touch it.
- The hot-running inner envelope is protected from contamination, and the bulb may be handled without damaging it.
- Surroundings are protected from the possible shattering of the inner capsule.
- The jacket may filter out UV radiation.
- When a halogen bulb is used to replace a normal incandescent bulb in a fitting, the larger jacket makes it mechanically similar to the bulb it replaces
- The inner and outer envelopes can be at different pressures, reducing heat dissipation by conduction or convection to optimize the trade-off between luminous efficacy and lifetime.

== Form factors ==
Halogen lamps are available in a series of different shapes and sizes, and are designated according to a coding system that specifies the diameter of the bulb as well as whether or not the bulb has a built-in infrared-transparent dichroic reflector. Many such lamps have designations that begin with the letter "T" to indicate that they are "tubular", followed by a number indicating the diameter of the tube in eighths of an inch. Therefore, a T3 bulb is a tubular halogen bulb that is 9.5 mm (3/8 in) in diameter. (Note: However, a T-3, T hyphen 3, is a halogen "tube" lamp that is 3/8 of an inch in diameter with a single bi-pin base rather than a T3 cylindrical tube 3/8 of an inch in diameter with electrodes at opposite ends.) The designation MR means "Multifaceted Reflector", with the number following this still corresponding to eighths of an inch in diameter of the overall bulb. (Note: Thus, an MR11 is a multifaceted reflector bulb that is 11/8 or 1 3/8 inches in diameter.) If a lamp has a "G" code, (Note: "G" stands for "glass") this will mean the lamp is a bipin shape and the number following the G will indicate the distance in millimeters between the pins, usually either 4, 6.35 or 10; if the G is followed by a letter "Y", then the lamp's pins are thicker than normal; thus, a G6.35 lamp has pins that are 1 mm in diameter but a GY6.35 has pins that are 1.3 mm in diameter. If there is a "C" code, this represents the number of coils in the filament. The length (sometimes also referred to as "height") of any two-ended cylindrical bulb must be specified separately from its form factor code, usually in millimeters, as must the lamp's voltage and wattage— hence, T3 120 V 150 W 118 mm means a double-ended tube-shaped bulb with a diameter of 9.5 mm (3/8 in) that operates at 120 V and is 150 W and that is also 118 mm long.

An R7S is a double-ended, Recessed Single Contact (RSC) linear halogen lamp, usually measuring a length of either 118 mm or 78 mm. Some less common lengths are 189 mm, 254 mm and 331 mm. These lamps have a T3 shape on an RSC/R7S base. These are also known as J-type and T-type lamps.

== Applications ==
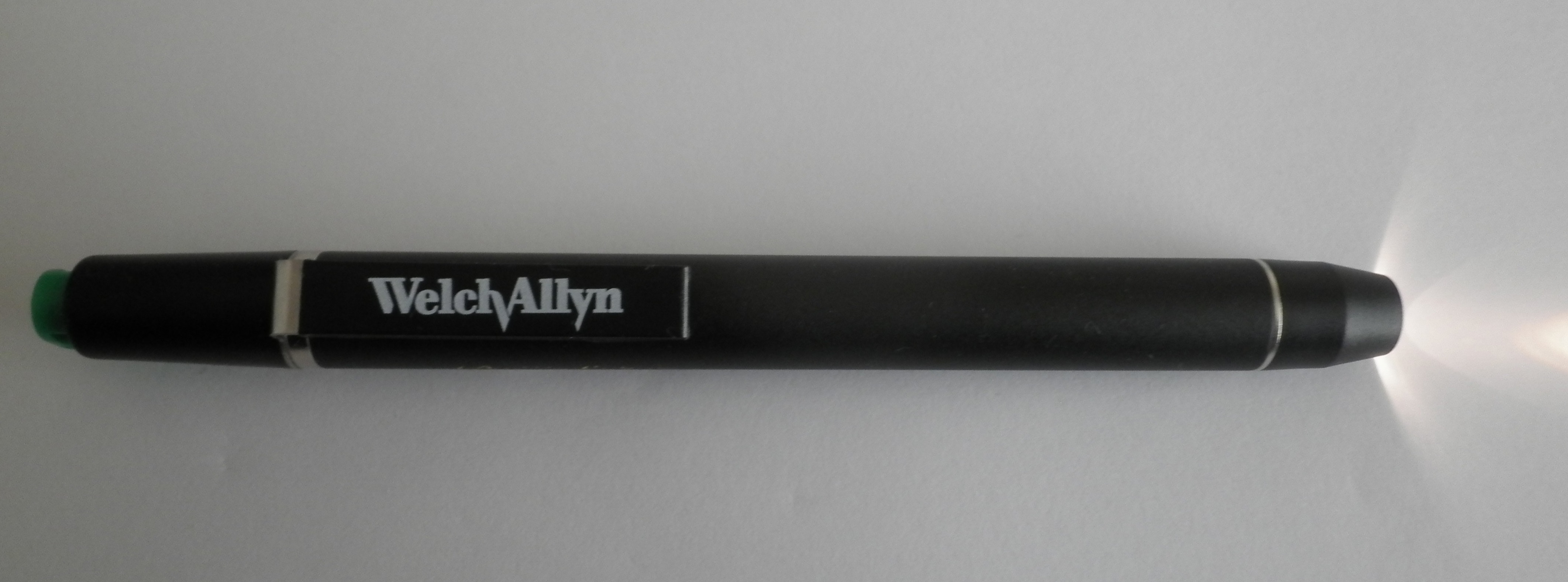
A medical halogen penlight to observe the pupillary light reflex

Halogen headlamps are used in many automobiles. Halogen floodlights for outdoor lighting systems, as well as for watercraft, are also manufactured for commercial and recreational use. They are now also used in desktop lamps.

Tungsten-halogen lamps are frequently used as a near-infrared light source in Infrared spectroscopy.

=== Heating ===
Halogen lamps are the heating elements in halogen ovens, infrared heaters and ceramic cooktops.

Banks of powerful tubular halogen lamps were used to simulate the heat of re-entry of space vehicles.

=== General lighting ===
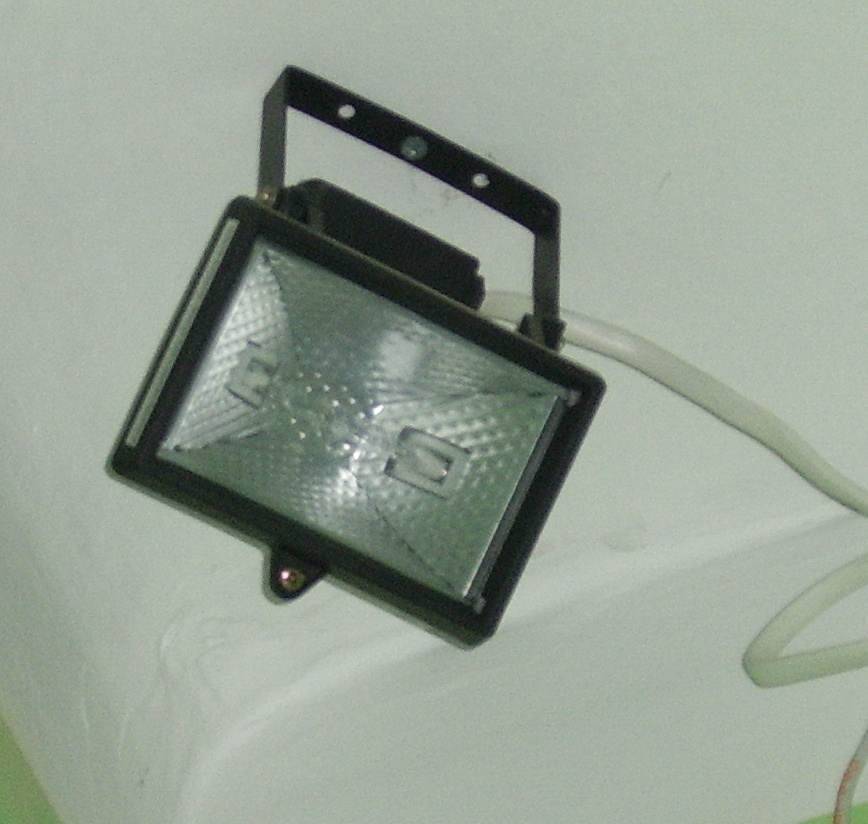
A 150W Halogen floodlight

Fixed-mount lamps are used in indoor and outdoor flood lighting, although improvements in LED systems are displacing halogen lamps. Round spotlights with built-in multifaceted reflector lamps are widely used in residential and commercial lighting. Tubular halogen lamps provide a large quantity of light from a small source and so can be used to produce powerful flood lamps for architectural lighting effects, or for lighting large areas outdoors.

Low-voltage lamps use the GU5.3 and similar bi-pin bases, whereas mains voltage lamps use the same caps as normal mains tungsten filament lamps, or a special GU10/GZ10 base. The GU10/GZ10 bases are shaped to prevent dichroic reflector lamps from being used in luminaires intended for aluminised reflector lamps, which could cause overheating of the fitting. Higher efficiency LED versions of all of these lamps are now available.

Tubular lamps with electrical contacts at both ends are now commonly used in standalone lighting and household fixtures. These come in various lengths and power ratings (50–300 W). More powerful lamps are used as portable work lights, with bulbs rated 250 or 500 watts.

=== Stage lighting ===
Tungsten halogen lamps are used in the majority of theatrical and studio (film and television) fixtures, including Ellipsoidal reflector spotlights, Fresnels, and PAR Cans.

=== Specialized ===
Projection lamps are used in motion-picture and slide projectors for homes and small offices or school use. The compact size of the halogen lamp permits a reasonable size for portable projectors, although heat-absorbing filters must be placed between the lamp and the film to prevent melting. Halogen lamps are sometimes used for inspection lights and microscope stage illuminators. Halogen lamps were used for early flat-screen LCD backlighting, but other types of lamps, such as CCFL and now LED, are used. Halogen lamps are used as the heating element in the fuser of many types of laser printers. The long tubular lamp heats the fuser roller from the inside, and the heat melts the toner onto the paper.

== Disposal ==
Halogen lamps do not contain any mercury. General Electric says that its quartz halogen lamps would not be classified as hazardous waste.

== See also ==
- Bi-pin connector for base designations GY6.35, G8, etc.
- FEL lamp
- Lightbulb socket for other bases
- List of light sources
