= Halogen oven =

Cooking pot that uses halogen bulbs

A halogen oven, halogen convection oven, or halogen cooking pot is a type of oven that utilizes a halogen lamp as its heating element. Because a fan is used, it is also a convection oven. Halogen ovens are often noted for being more energy-efficient than a conventional electric oven due to their more effective heating of food and faster cooking times.

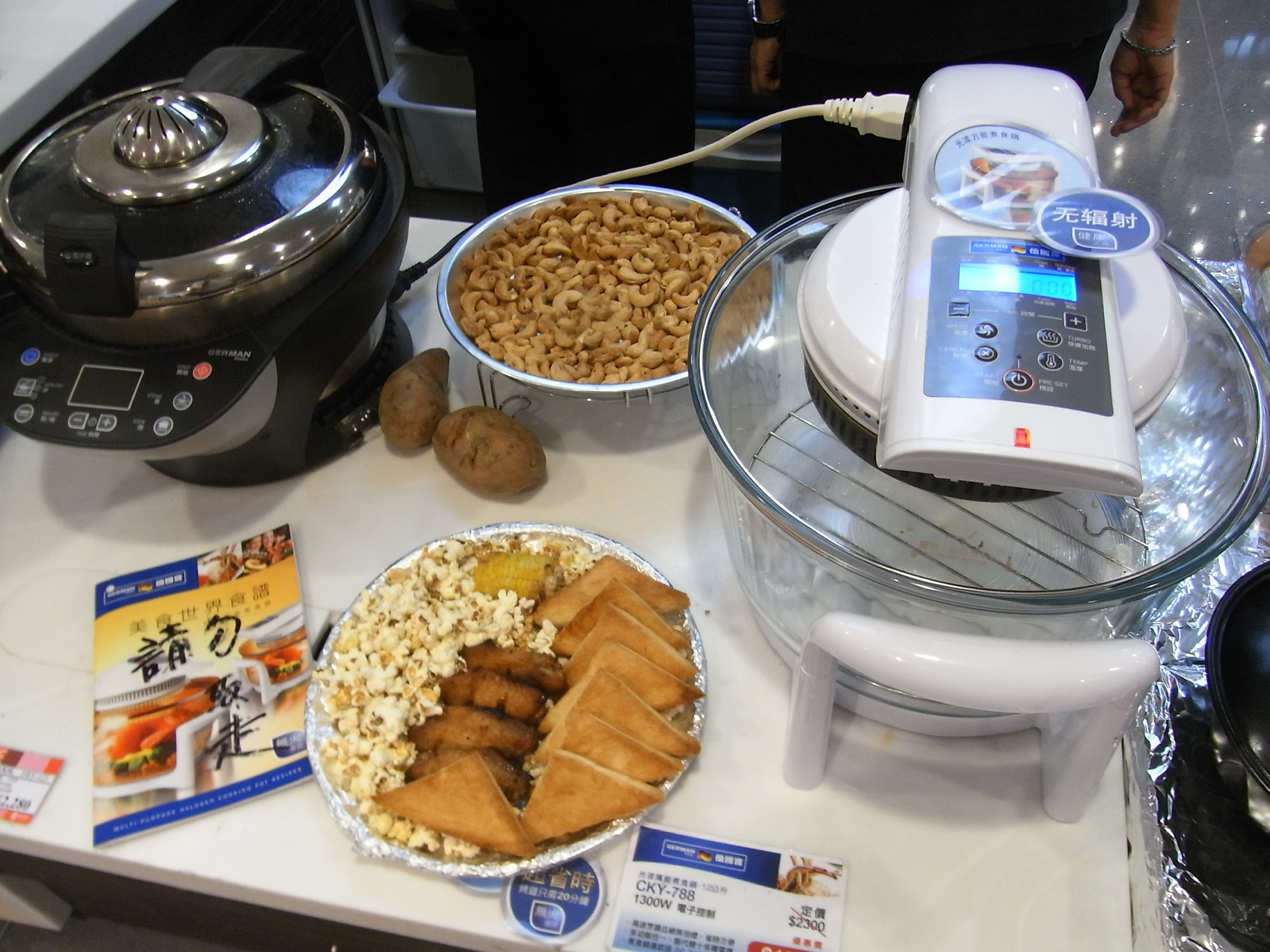
Halogen cooking pot (right) from manufacturer German Pool (Hong Kong)

== Design ==
A basic halogen oven features a heating chamber consisting of a clear glass bowl with a removable glass lid to which the heating assembly is secured. Inside the heating chamber, multi-level metal racks are used to elevate the contents during the cooking process. Within the heating assembly are the circular halogen lamp, a fan, and the controls for the oven which frequently include an automatic shut-off timer and a temperature control interface. On a basic model, the heating assembly has a handle to allow users to safely lift the lid off the unit. More elaborate models have a hinged lid mounted on an adjustable rear support which can be raised to accommodate an extension ring. This raises the heating assembly to reduce the grilling effect as well as increasing the volume of the oven. Hinged models are safer and easier to use. A safety shut-off switch turns off the lamp when the lid is raised during operation. The glass bowl is positioned in a stand which raises the bowl off the table-top and decreases the transfer of heat to the surrounding surfaces. Handles are often incorporated into the stand to allow for users to move the unit, providing safety especially during or after operation.

=== Operation ===
The halogen lamp is turned on and off by a simple thermostat or electronic control and generates waves of infrared light to heat the air within the heating chamber. The fan then circulates this heated air throughout the chamber to evenly cook the contents of the bowl through convective heat transfer. It can be self-cleaned by adding some hot water and detergent to the empty bowl. The fan swirls the hot water and usually takes about ten minutes to remove any grease and some food deposits.

=== Efficiency ===
Reports often claim halogen ovens have shorter cooking times than conventional ovens, with one report stating a figure of up to 40% faster, but 20% faster on average. Another report claims a halogen oven cooks food up to 60% faster than a conventional oven. In terms of energy use, one source claims that a halogen oven uses about "half the electricity of a conventional oven and about the same as a microwave oven".

== See also ==
- Convective heat transfer
- Halogen lamp
- Oven
- Toaster oven
