= FEL lamp =

The FEL lamp (less accurately called a light bulb) is an ANSI standard 1000 watt quartz halogen lamp with a G9.5 medium 2-pin base used in many stage and studio lights that costs around $12 and is available from a number of manufacturers including GE, Osram, Ushio, Eiko, and Philips. Note that the term FEL is an ANSI designation (not an acronym).

== Description ==
FEL lamps are a working standard used to ensure optical equipment meets NIST standards. Specially seasoned and calibrated FEL lamps are used in laboratories as radiance and irradiance standards (related to luminance and illuminance) used to calibrate photometers, light meters, spectrophotometers and other laboratory instruments.

An FEL lamp purchased from NIST that has been calibrated for light output, color temperature, and spectral energy distribution is over ten thousand dollars. NIST Traceable FEL lamps are available from commercial suppliers.

== Sockets ==
Matching sockets for the G9.5 base include Sylvania TP22, TP220, Buhl Electric QEW-2, QEW-21, QEW-22, Bender + Wirth 968, Ushio: C-3, C-3(A). The calibration lamps are generally modified to use a larger bi-post base that fits into special kinematic mount sockets for precise optical alignment.

Although the socket for calibration lamps is not polarized, polarity must be observed because the calibration lamps are normally run on DC and the lamp filament will recrystallize according to the applied DC polarity.
