= Bipin Ganatra =

Electrician and social worker

Bipin Ganatra (born c. 1957) is an electrician in Kolkata, West Bengal, India. He is also an unofficial volunteer firefighter and was awarded the Padma Shri in 2017 for helping fight fires in the city.

== Inspiration ==
As a child Ganatra would rush after fire engines when he heard them and would start helping the firemen when he reached the scene of the fire. In 1982, Bipin, then only 12 years old, lost his elder brother Narendra to a freak fire accident which occurred when a spark fell on fuel that his brother was handling while working on a motorcycle. His brother was admitted to hospital and succumbed to his injuries a little over a month later.

== Life ==
Bipin, originally from Gujarat, has been offering his services as a fireman in the city of Kolkata, whose firefighting force of 1,258 firemen battled some 2,000 fires in 2014 and 1,600 fires in 2015. He is an electrician by trade and earns a meager salary, borrowing from his friends to make ends meet. He also helps the police manage traffic.

Bipin does not have any formal training with regards to firefighting. He started out by helping firefighters do odd jobs but now has risen to the level of a professional firefighter. Over 40 years, Bipin has assisted in more than 100 fires, working to put out the flames, rescue victims, and clear away debris. One of his most dramatic rescues was of a pregnant woman trapped on the fifth floor of a burning building. The woman was too scared to move, so Bipin scaled the building to reach her and convince her to come down. Bipin has suffered injuries several times while helping put out flames, and also risked his life to extract two unexploded cylinders from a burning warehouse on Strand Road.

Bipin monitors the television news constantly and informs the fire department if a fire breaks out. Despite his contributions to the force he travels to the site by himself using public transport. In recognition of his efforts, the fire department has given him a rare steel volunteer card and a khaki uniform.
