= Bi-pin lamp base =

Type of lamp/lightbulb fitting/connector

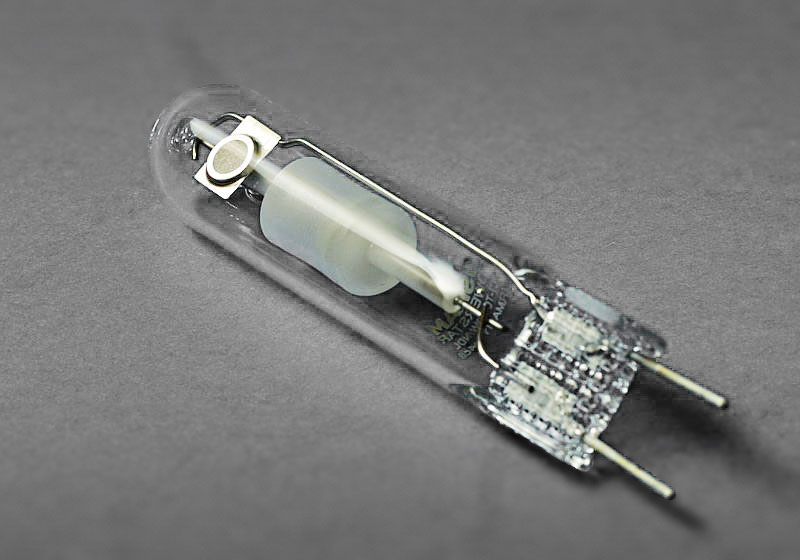
A metal halide lamp with a bipin cap

A bipin or bi-pin (sometimes referred to as two-pin, bipin cap or bipin socket) is a type of lamp fitting. They are included in the IEC standard "IEC 60061 Lamp caps and holders together with gauges for the control of interchangeability and safety". They are used on many small incandescent light bulbs (especially halogen lamps), and for starters on some types of fluorescent lights.

Some sockets have pins placed closer together, preventing the low-power bulbs they use from being replaced by bulbs that are too high power, which may generate excessive heat and possibly cause a fire. These are sometimes called "mini-bipin". Where the terminals of the lamp are bent back onto the sides of the base of the bulb, this forms a wedge base, often used in small bulbs for automotive lighting.

The bi-pin base was invented by Reginald Fessenden for the 1893 World's Fair in Chicago. After Westinghouse won the contract to wire and illuminate the first electrified fair with AC instead of arch-rival Thomas Edison's DC, Edison and his General Electric company refused to allow his patented Edison screw-base bulbs to be used. Westinghouse overcame this by developing the bi-pin base for use at the fair. An incandescent electric lamp with a bi-pin base was patented by the Westinghouse (G. Westinghouse, Jr.) in 1895.

== Types ==
Illustration	Designation	IEC 60061-1 sheet	Pin		Usage
Illustration	Designation	IEC 60061-1 sheet	Pitch	Diameter	Usage
G4 bi-pin connector	G4	7004-72-3	4.0 mm	0.65–0.75 mm	Small halogen quartz capsules of 5/10/20 watt and 6/12 volt AC and DC.
	GU4	7004-108-2	4.0 mm	0.95–1.05 mm	MR11 and MR8
	GY4	7004-72A-1	4.0 mm	0.65–0.75 mm	
	GZ4	7004-67-3	4.0 mm	0.95–1.05 mm	MR11 and MR8
	G5	7004-52-7	5 mm		T4 and T5 fluorescent tubes
G5.3 bi-pin connector	G5.3	7004-73-2	5.33 mm	1.47–1.65 mm	
	G5.3-4.8	7004-126-1			
MR16 LED lamp with GU5.3 base	GU5.3	7004-109-2	5.33 mm	1.45-1.6 mm	
	GX5.3	7004-73A-2	5.33 mm	1.45–1.6 mm	Round pins. MR16 and other small halogens of 20/35/50 watt and 12/24 volt.
GY5.3 base	GY5.3	7004-73B-2	5.33 mm	—	Flat pins
G6.35 bi-pin connector	G6.35	7004-59-6	6.35 mm	0.95–1.05 mm	
	GX6.35	7004-59-6	6.35 mm	0.95–1.05 mm	
	GY6.35	7004-59-6	6.35 mm	1.2–1.3 mm	Halogen various wattage (e.g. 50 W/100 W), various voltage (e.g. 12/24 V). Common for task lighting, landscape lighting.
	GZ6.35	7004-59A-3	6.35 mm	0.95–1.05 mm	projector bulb
	G8	—	8.0 mm	1.0 mm	Halogen 35–100 W 120-240 V
	GY8.6	—	8.0 mm	1.25 mm	Halogen up to 100 W, 120 V
G9 bi-pin connector	G9	7004-129-3	9.0 mm		Halogen 120 V (US) / 230 V (EU), also used for LED lamps.
	G9.5	7004-70-2	9.5 mm	3.10–3.25 mm	Common for theatre use, several variants
GU10 bi-pin connector	GU10	7004-121-2	10 mm	5 mm	Twist-lock 120/230-volt MR16 halogen lighting of 35/50 watt, since the mid-2000s. Also used for compact fluorescents and LED lamps.
	GZ10	7004-120-1	10 mm		Twist-lock 120/230-volt MR16 halogen lighting of 35/50 watt, differs from GU10 by use of a dichroic reflector. GZ10 fixtures can use GU10 bulbs, but not vice versa.
	G12	7004-63-2	12.0 mm	2.35 mm	Used in theatre and single-end metal halide lamps.
	G13	7004-51-10	0.50 in (12.7 mm)	0.093 in (2.35 mm)	Common T8, T10 and T12 fluorescent tubes.
	GX16d				"Mogul End Prong", common for theatre PAR lamps.
	G23	7004-69-1	23 mm	2 mm	
	GU24	7004-78-5	24 mm		Twist-lock for self-ballasted compact fluorescents, since the 2000s.
2000-W halogen lamp with G38 base	G38	7004-76-1	38 mm	11.1 mm	Mostly used for high-power theatre lamps.
11-W 1000-lm LED lamp with GX53 base	GX53	7004-142-2	53 mm		Twist-lock for puck-shaped under-cabinet compact fluorescents and LED lamps, since the 2000s.
	GX70	—	70 mm		Twist-lock for puck-shaped compact fluorescents or LED lamps.

The suffix after the G indicates the pin spread; the G dates to the use of Glass for the original bulbs. GU usually also indicates that the lamp provides a mechanism for physical support by the luminaire: in some cases, each pin has a short section of larger diameter at the end (sometimes described as a "peg" rather than a "pin"); the socket allows the bulb to lock into place by twisting it; in others, the base of the lamp has a groove which can be held by a spring or clip.

A lowercase "q" at the end of the designation indicates that it is a quad-pin base, with two bi-pin pairs. These are used with compact fluorescent tubes that plug into a light fixture that has a permanent ballast.

There are also double-ended halogen and fluorescent tubes with one pin at each end, and high-output fluorescents with recessed or shrouded contacts, which are not covered here.

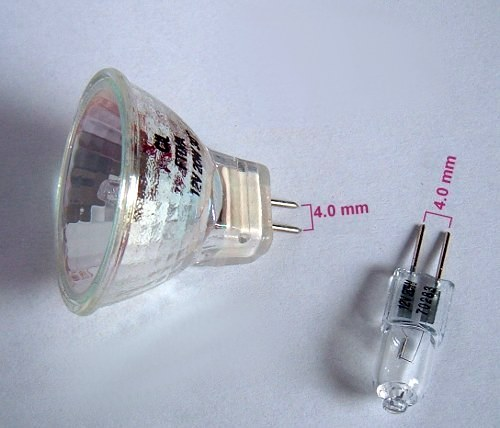
Halogen lamps with GU4 (left) and G4 (right) bases

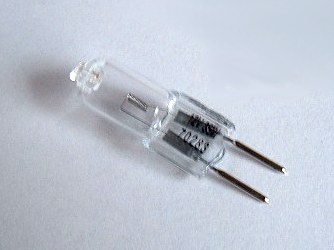
Halogen lamp with G6.35 base

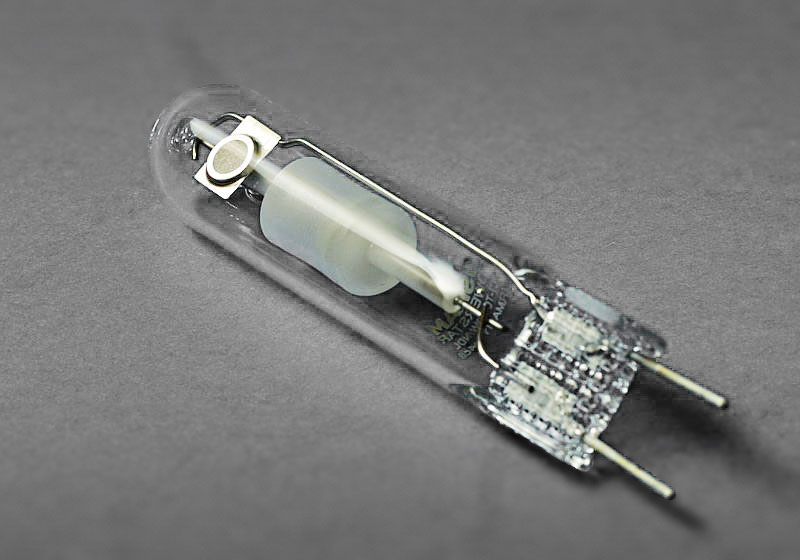
Metal halide lamp with G8.5 base

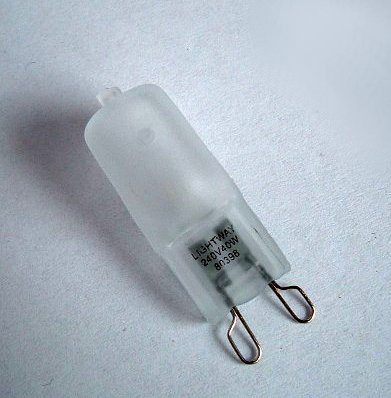
Halogen lamp with G9 looped-pin base

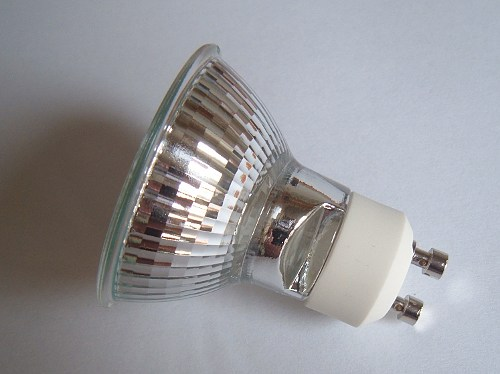
Halogen lamp with GU10 twist-lock base

== See also ==
- Bayonet mount
- Fluorescent-lamp formats
- Fluorescent lamp
- Multifaceted reflector (MR)
