= List of power stations in Northern Ireland =

This is a list of electricity-generating power stations in Northern Ireland, sorted by type and name, with installed capacity (May 2011).

Note that the Digest of United Kingdom energy statistics (DUKES) maintains a comprehensive list of United Kingdom power stations, accessible through the Department of Energy and Climate Change here.

A red background denotes a power station that is no longer operational.

== List ==
Name	Operator	Location	Type	Capacity (MW)	Commissioned	Closed
Ballylumford A	AES Corporation	Islandmagee, County Antrim	Coal	660	1943	1974
Ballylumford B	AES Corporation	Islandmagee, County Antrim	Oil	960	1968	2018
Ballylumford C	EPUKI	Islandmagee, County Antrim	CCGT	616	2003	-
Kilroot power station	EPUKI	Kilroot, County Antrim	Oil/coal	662	1981	2023
Kilroot Thermal Units	EPUKI	Kilroot, County Antrim	Oil	141	2007/2009	
Kilroot (new OCGT's)	EPUKI	Kilroot, County Antrim	OCGT	700	2024	-
Belfast East	Belfast Corporation	Belfast	Coal	174.75	1959	1959
Belfast West	Belfast Corporation	Belfast	Coal	240	1959	2002
East Bridge Street	Belfast Corporation	Belfast	Coal	12	operating 1959	1959
Londonderry Corporation	Londonderry Corporation	Londonderry	Coal	18	1894	1959
Curran Point	Northern Ireland Electricity Board	Larne	Coal	5.7	operating 1959	1959
Limavady	Northern Ireland Electricity Board	Roe Valley, Limavady	Hydro electric	0.072	1896	1963
Gruig	RES-Gen Ltd	Loughguile, County Antrim	Wind	25	2009	-
Coolkeeragh power station	Northern Ireland Electricity Board	Derry, County Londonderry	Oil		1959	2005
Coolkeeragh power station	ESBI	Derry, County Londonderry	CCGT	408	2005	-
Lisahally Power Station	BWSC GS-NI	Derry, County Londonderry	Biomass	17	2016	-
Slieve Divena	Infinis Windfarm^{*}	Garvaghy, County Tyrone	Wind	30	2009	-
Lendrum's Bridge	RES-Gen Ltd	Fintona, County Tyrone	Wind	13	2000	-
Altahullion	RES-Gen Ltd	Limavady, County Londonderry	Wind	26	2003	-
Altahullion2	RES-Gen Ltd	Limavady, County Londonderry	Wind	12	2007	-
Lough Hill	RES-Gen Ltd	Drumquin, County Tyrone	Wind	8	2007	-
Bessy Bell 1	E.On UK	Newtownstewart, County Tyrone	Wind	5	1995	-
Bessy Bell 2	E.On UK	Newtownstewart, County Tyrone	Wind	9	2008	-
Bin Mountain	Airtricity	Benaughlin Mountain, County Fermanagh	Wind	9	2007	-
Tappaghan	Airtricity	Lack, County Fermanagh	Wind	29	2005	-
Callagheen	Scottish Power	Belleek, County Fermanagh	Wind	17	2006	-
Corkey	Scottish Power	Cloughmills, County Antrim	Wind	5	1994	-
Elliots Hill	Scottish Power	Ballyclare, County Antrim	Wind	5	1995	-
Rigged Hill	Scottish Power	Limavady, County Londonderry	Wind	5	1994	-
Wolf Bog	Scottish Power	Ballyclare, County Antrim	Wind	10	2008	-
SeaGen	Marine Current Turbines	Strangford Lough, County Down	Tidal	1.2	2008	2016

^{*}Joint venture with Scottish and Southern Energy

== Tidal power ==
Northern Ireland was home to the world's first commercially viable tidal stream generator. Trials were begun in Scotland, then in England, before Marine Current Turbines installed the thousand-tonne SeaGen turbine at the mouth of Strangford Lough. The lough was chosen because it has one of the fastest tidal flows in the world. The installation went live and was connected to the grid in mid-December 2008, injecting an extra 1.2 megawatts of electricity.

The turbine was scheduled to produce power for five years, though Marine Current Turbines were reported to have asked for an extension beyond their 2013 contract. By March 2010, the turbine had passed an operating time of over 1,000 hours - a first for any marine energy device.

Impact to the environment was closely scrutinised. The device, built in Belfast's famous Harland and Wolff shipyard, is rigged with a sonar device which stops the motion of the rotor blades when it detects marine lifeform near it. While there has been no negative affect to the environment - a special protected wildlife area - it has been noticed that porpoises stop communicating while passing the device.

== See also ==
- Northern Ireland Electricity
- List of power stations in England
- List of power stations in Scotland
- List of power stations in Wales
- List of power stations in the Republic of Ireland
