= Micro-Vett =

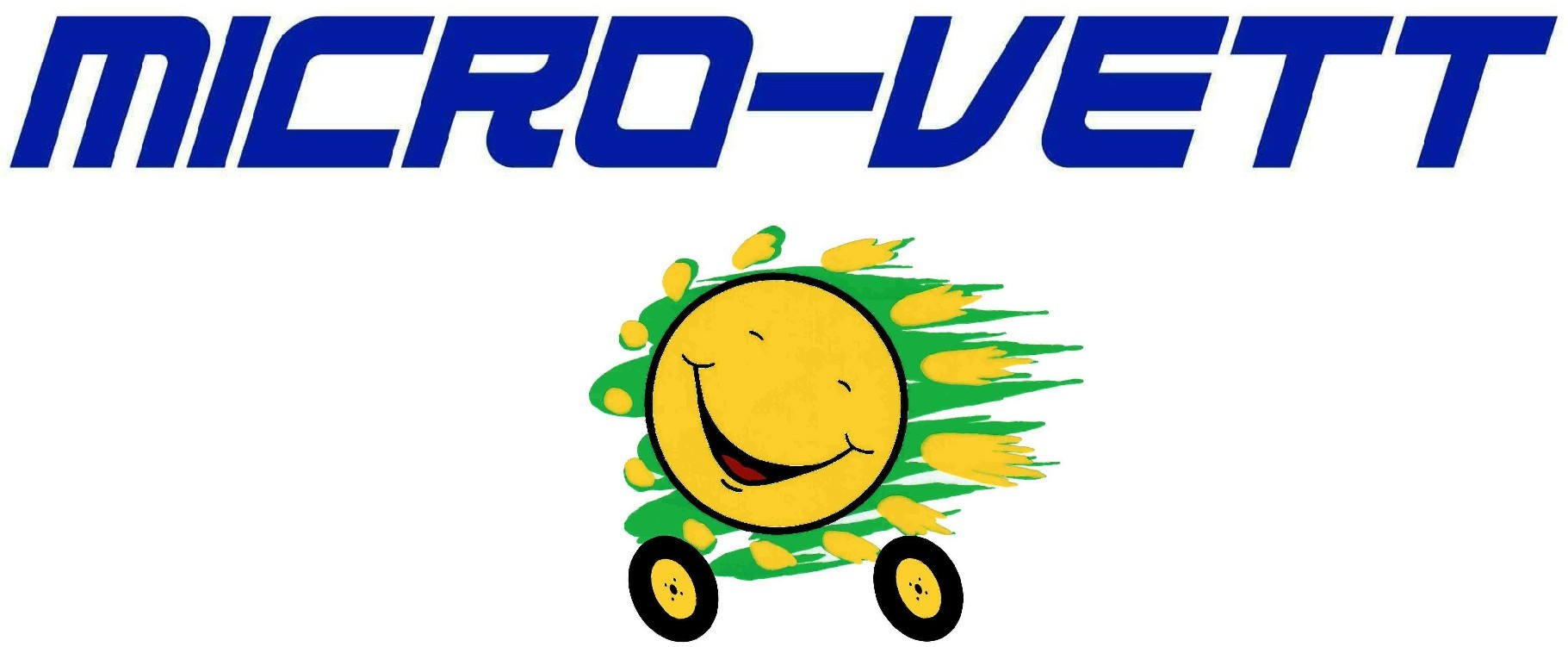
- Industry: Automotive
- Founded: 1986
- Headquarters: Italy
- Products: electric vehicles

Micro-Vett was an Italian company manufacturing electric vehicles.

== History ==
=== Beginning ===
Micro-Vett was founded in 1986 in Voltana di Lugo (RA) by three shareholders including Mr. Galli and Mr. Giacomoni. A new four-wheel electric vehicle, similar to current quadricycles, the Lady, was developed and built from scratch. Starting from 1989 Coop. Car, a cooperative from Imola, gradually acquired Micro-Vett shares becoming majority shareholder and transferring the headquarters to Imola. At that time, the management faced difficulties related to manufacturing vehicles and decided to focus solely on electrification components. Consequently, Micro-Vett started a partnership with Bedford for the electrification of Rascal. In 1991, after the bankruptcy of parent company Coop. Car, even Micro-Vett was declared bankrupted and, after a brief period of inactivity, it was taken over by Mr. Gaetano Di Gioia, already manager of his buyout by Coop. Car.

=== The Electric Porter ===
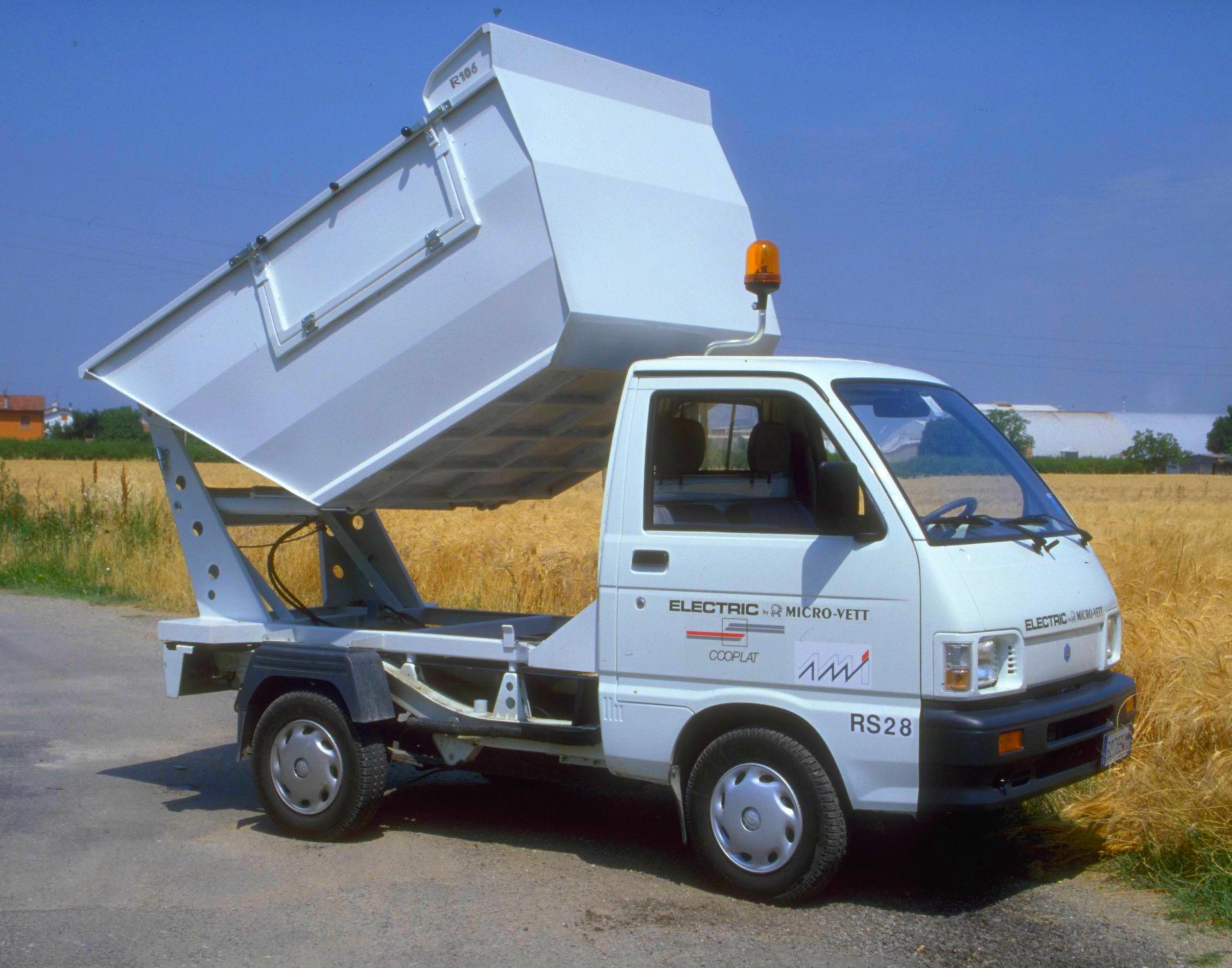
Micro-Vett Electric Porter

The company from Imola continued the production of the electrified Rascal, but given the lack of involvement of the vehicle manufacturer, Micro-Vett started a collaboration with Piaggio The electrified Porter was a great success in the Italian market, thanks to purchasing incentives. It was manufactured from 1994 to 2003 in about 5,000 units. The lead-acid batteries provided a range of 60 km and a top speed of 65 km/h. Piaggio delivered the vehicles without the endothermic engine to Micro-Vett, which in turn converted them to pure electric vehicles. The sale of the complete vehicle was almost exclusively done by Piaggio. During this period the company took part in many sport events for electric vehicles, including the 24 hours of Turin and the Monte-Carlo Rally for alternative energies propelled vehicles, winning prestigious results.

=== Zebra batteries and the new vehicles ===
Starting from the end of the 1990s, the technology of Zebra batteries provided an energy density about four times more than lead-acid batteries. Micro-Vett created many prototypes including Eurocargo in association with Iveco and different units of Porter with improved range. Since 2001 Micro-Vett fleet expanded with the introduction of electric Daily and Ydea, a quadricycle made by Casalini. However, the high cost of the improved Zebra batteries severely limited the market penetration, that was still dominated by the electric Porter. Another innovation was a Daily in a plug-in hybrid version, first manufactured in 2004. By placing an electric motor on the shaft, the vehicle could be propelled by either the diesel engine or the electric motor, ensuring a unique flexibility of use. The battery could be both charged from the electrical grid and the diesel engine when the car was in use. Iveco was, however, not interested, leading Micro-Vett to directly market the vehicle with a total sale of approximately 600 units between 2004 and 2011.

=== Lithium batteries and FIAT range ===
Already in 2005, as low-cost lithium batteries for automotive use started appearing from Chinese manufactures, Micro-Vett began working on prototypes equipped with this technology. The company began the manufacturing of Fiat Doblò in an electric version. This vehicle was also sold directly by Micro-Vett to final customers, as the conversion was not explicitly supported by FIAT. The new batteries guaranteed a range up to 150 km, but had safety issues pushing Micro-Vett to finally focus on two battery manufacturers from South Korea. In 2009 Micro-Vett started the production of an electric Fiorino/Qubo that was a market success is Italy and Europe. In 2007, the company created a network of European and extra-European dealers, with the main markets being France, Germany, Norway, the Netherlands and Spain, but many vehicles were also sold in Russia, Hong Kong, Finland and Baltic countries.

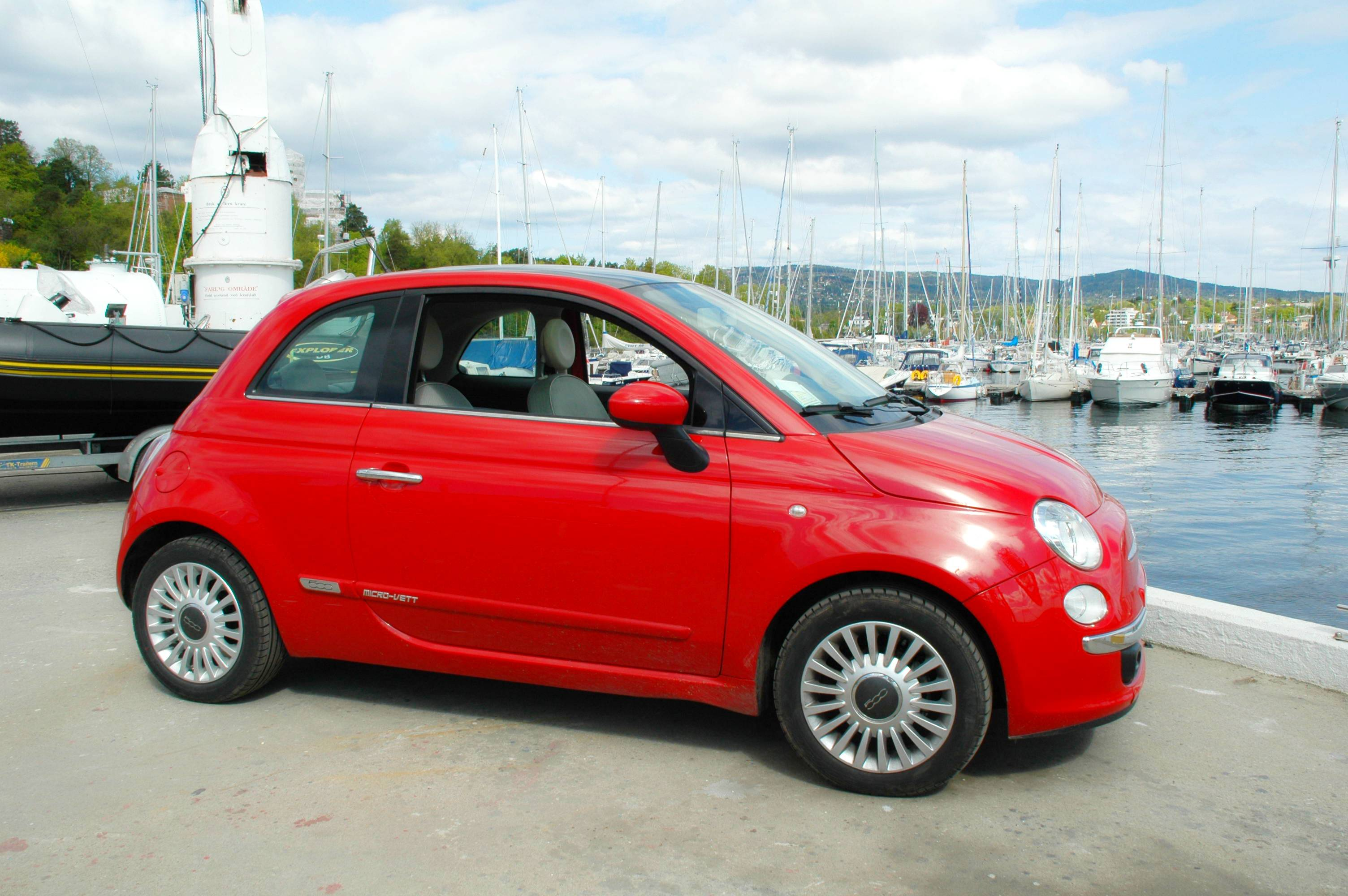
Micro-Vett Electric 500

In 2009 the company also developed the e500, electric version of the new Fiat 500, which was presented at London Motorshow by the English dealer Nice Car. The electric Ducato, in all its models, was also developed my Micro-Vett. The configuration of the batteries could be adapted to customer requirements. For this vehicle Micro-Vett started a partnership with the French company Gruau, which installed kits provided by Micro-Vett. Since 2006 Piaggio offered an independently made version of electric Porter, triggering Micro-Vett do search for a new collaboration partner. An attempted partnership with Uz-Daewoo was unsuccessful and other partnership with Chinese OEMs or Italian importers of Chinese vehicles also failed. Finally Micro-Vett begun a relationship with VEM, which led to the birth of the EdyOne in 2011.

=== Prototypes and projects ===
Throughout its history, Micro-Vett implemented many electric-powered prototypes, including the bus Albatros in collaboration with the local public transport company of Rimini, a Ducato with endothermic engine on the front axle and electric motor on the rear axle in partnership with Al-Ko, a three-wheeled motorcycle, a bimodal hearse, an all-electric excavator in collaboration with Venieri and a bimodal boat for carrying 70 people. Micro-Vett also developed CHAdeMO protocols for rapid charging of its vehicles at 50 kW; moreover the company also attended many national and European projects, including Green eMotion under the 7th European framework program.

=== Customers ===
At the beginning of 2011, the company had a turnover of around 17 million Euros and employed 50 people. The vehicle range included EdyOne, e500, Fiorino, Doblò, Ducato and Bimodal Daily. Main customers were state-owned companies and delivery companies, including Trambus, Reggio Emilia Municipality, Italian Mail, Turin Municipality, Milan Municipality, San Martino Hospital in Genoa, Cinque Terre National Park, VeLoCe from Vicenza, Bartolini, DHL, Acciona Madrid, Eurodisney Paris, La Poste France, Cannes Municipality, Monaco Municipality, Moscow Municipality, RWE, ESB Ireland, among others.

=== Bankruptcy ===
Due to both the electric vehicle market contraction caused by the 2008 financial crisis, unpaid debts due by Italian state-owned companies and technical problems related to defective components, Micro-Vett faced liquidity challenges from the second half of 2011. In February 2013 the court of Bologna declared its bankruptcy.

=== Attempted relaunch ===
Following several failed bankruptcy auctions without offers, the company was taken over in April 2014 by the Bocchi family, moving headquarters to Altavilla Vicentina. The new company was led by Claudio Cicero, who already had experience in the Micro-Vett company and winner of the 2010 World Championship FIA Alternative Energies Cup with a Micro-Vett e500. Despite the limited manpower following the Imola phase, the company manufactured purely electric prototypes on Fiat chassis: Panda, Fiorino and Doblò. The technical peculiarity of these vehicles was the application of an innovative idea aimed to maintain all the auxiliary services activated by the belt of the combustion engine. This would lead to lower costs and greater reliability. Fiat showed a lot of interest in these vehicles and Micro-Vett approached several companies based in Piedmont to start manufacturing, but no agreement was reached and activities gradually slowed down to a grinding halt. At the end of 2016, the whole workforce left Micro-Vett. As of mid 2019 the website is no longer active.
