= Golden Falls hydroelectric power station =

- Golden Falls Reservoir in 2024

- Location within Ireland
- Coordinates: 53.12041°N 6.6081°W
- Status: Operational
- Opening date: 1943
- Owner: ESB Group

Dam and spillways
- Type of dam: Gravity
- Height: 15 m (50 ft)
- Length: 98 m (320 ft)

Reservoir
- Total capacity: 0.8×10^{6} m^{2} (0.31 mi^{2})
- Catchment area: 312 km^{2} (120 mi^{2})

Power Station
- Commission date: 1943
- Turbines: 1
- Installed capacity: 4 MW
- Annual generation: 9 GWh (32 TJ) average

Golden Falls hydroelectric power station is a hydroelectric plant located on the River Liffey in County Kildare, Ireland. It is owned and operated by the ESB Group.

== Construction ==
Golden Falls hydroelectric plant is located downstream of the larger Pollaphuca hydroelectric power station as part of the River Liffey Scheme. The concrete dam is 98 m (320 ft) long is fitted with three gates, each of which is 7 m (23 ft) wide. The dam has an average head of 17.4 m (57 ft). The dam creates a compensation reservoir with a surface area of approximately 256,000 square metres (measured from satellite imagery).

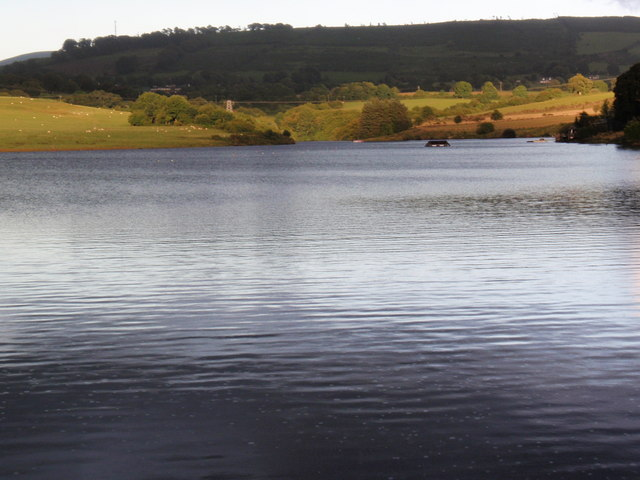
Golden Falls Lake in 2009

== Generating capacity ==
The plant consists of a single turbine rated at 4 MW (5,400 hp) manufactured by English Electric. It spins at 187.5 r.p.m. and feeds a 5,000 kVA English Electric three phase alternator running at 10.5 kV. The average output for the station is 9 GWh a year.

== Archaeological importance ==
The Bronze Age Bishopsland Hoard was excavated during the construction of the dam in 1942 and subsequently other archaeological finds from periods back to the Neolithic have been found in the area.
