= William F. Roe =

Irish electrical engineer

- Born: 1904; Kilkenny, County Kilkenny
- Died: 1982 (aged 77–78)
- Occupation: Electrical engineer
- Notable work: Electrification of rural Ireland

William F. Roe (1904-1982) was an electrical engineer who led the rural electrification scheme in Ireland.

== Early life and education ==
He was born at 25 Patrick Street, Kilkenny, Ireland, only son of William and Mary Roe (née Duggan). Educated at home until aged nine, he then went to Christian Brothers School, Kilkenny, and later to University College Dublin and the Royal College of Science for Ireland.

He graduated from UCD in 1924, BEng Civil Engineering and from UCD and the College of Science in 1925, BEng Mechanical and Electrical Engineering, and ARCScI in each case with first class honours.

== Career ==
Roe joined the electricity department of Dublin Corporation, moving the following year to the Shannon Power Development Board and in 1928 he transferred to the newly formed Electricity Supply Board (ESB).

Roe's early career in the ESB saw him as District Engineer in Portlaoise, Waterford and Cork City. When the Rural Electrification Scheme was initiated in 1945, the experience Roe became the first Engineer-in-Charge. In 1950, he was appointed Assistant Chief Engineer of the ESB and in 1965 Deputy Chief Engineer, all the time keeping his finger on the pulse of the Rural Scheme.

He was also the Chairman of the Industrial Engineering Co. (Dundalk), and of its four subsidiaries. Roe was undoubtedly the best-known ESB Engineer in Ireland.

He was also a founding member of Cumann na n'Innealtóiri (The Engineers Association), serving for a number of years on its council, also on the Council of the Institution of Civil Engineers of Ireland, both of which merged in 1969 and became the Institution of Engineers of Ireland. He also served on the council of the early Irish Management Institute. He was the first Chairman of the Irish Branch, Institute of Electrical Engineers (now the IET).

He served for a long number of years on the National Executive of Muintir na Tíre. His leadership (spurred by commitment to social justice) and his inspired management skills ensured the success of the rural electrification scheme that made such a dramatic impact on rural life in Ireland.

(Biography to be published by Royal Irish Academy)

A plaque commemorating his contributions is on display at his birthplace in Patrick Street, Kilkenny.
