= Coolkeeragh Power Station =

Power station near Derry in Northern Ireland

Coolkeeragh power station
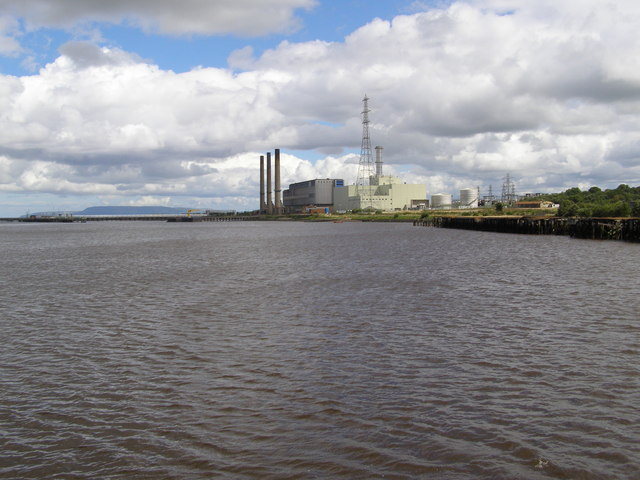
- Coolkeeragh power station in 2007, with the older oil-fired station behind the newer gas-fired station.
- Country: Northern Ireland
- Coordinates: 55.0437°N 7.249°W
- Commission date: 1959

Thermal power station
- Primary fuel: Natural gas
- Tertiary fuel: Oil-fired
- Combined cycle?: Yes

Coolkeeragh power station is a power station near Derry in Northern Ireland.

The station produces 400 megawatts from a gas-fired combined cycle power plant, constructed on the site of the old Coolkeeragh power station. Ownership of the plant was shared between Coolkeeragh Power Ltd and ESB International (ESBI) but it is now solely owned by ESB International (ESBI), a subsidiary of ESB.

Gas is supplied to the station by a pipeline that also serves many towns in Northern Ireland.

== History ==
Coolkeeragh Power Limited (CPL) had been generating electricity since 1959 and ceased operations at the end of March 2005. The old oil-fired plant had capacity 360 MW by 7 AEI Turboalternators: 2 by 30 megawatts and 5 by 60 megawatts. In 70s a 60 mw gas turbine generator is installed. Its consist four Rolls Royce Avon engines. The station was viewed as the least attractive power plant to sell off in Northern Ireland, because of its limited lifespan. Demolition of the old station was completed in 2010.

== New gas-fired power station ==
Construction of the new ESB owned 400 MW CCGT power station commenced in 2002 by the EPC consortium group of GE and VA Tech Hydro of Austria. The station entered commercial operation in June 2005. The station consists of a 260 MW General Electric 9FA+e gas turbine, a 140 MW Alstom steam turbine and Standard Fasel heat recovery steam generator (HRSG). Actual power output depends on atmospheric conditions, such as temperature and humidity. The gas turbine runs primarily on natural gas but can also operate on ultra low sulphur diesel in case of disruption of the gas supply.

Electricity is generated at 15.75 kV and then transformed up to 275 kV by step-up transformers to match the Northern Ireland Electricity Networks (NIEN) transmission system. This high voltage electricity is transferred by underground cables to existing outgoing feeder connections in an adjacent NIEN substation. The primary connection to the wider grid is through a double circuit 275 kV overhead tower line, which runs to a grid connection in Magherafelt.

== See also ==
- Electricity sector in Ireland
