= Northern Ireland Electricity =

Irish energy company

Northern Ireland Electricity Networks Limited
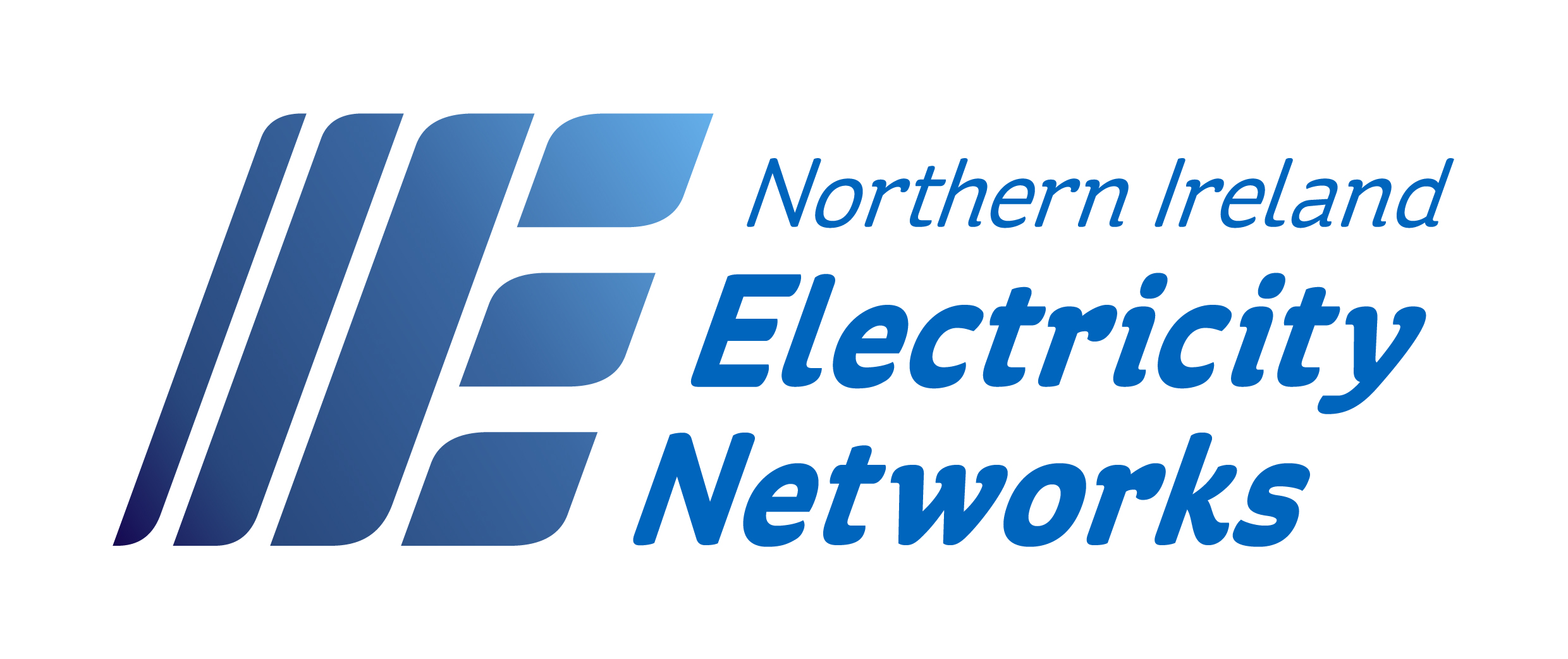
- Type: Private (subsidiary of ESB Group)
- Industry: Energy
- Founded: 1991
- Headquarters: Northern Ireland
- Revenue: ▼£407.9 million (2025)
- Operating income: ▼£150.5 million (2025)
- Net income: ▼£72.1 million (2025)
- Number of employees: ▲1681 (Dec 2025)
- Parent: ESB Group
- Website: www.nienetworks.co.uk

Northern Ireland Electricity Networks Limited (NIE Networks) is the electricity asset owner of the transmission and distribution infrastructure in Northern Ireland, established in 1993 when the business was privatised. NIE Networks does not generate or supply electricity. Since 2010 it has been a subsidiary of ESB Group.

NIE Networks has three transmission interconnectors with the transmission grid in the Republic of Ireland. The main interconnector was built in 1970 between Tandragee and County Louth but The Troubles saw the interconnector destroyed in 1975 and left in that state for twenty years until repair.

NIE Networks should not be confused with Power NI, its own former supply business, which was not part of the sale to the ESB and remains owned by Energia. NIE Energy changed its name to Power NI on 25 July 2011, as ESB retained the NIE name in Northern Ireland.

== History ==
=== Background ===
Electricity supplies in Ulster started in the early 1890s with the establishment of electricity undertakings by both Belfast Corporation and Londonderry Corporation. The co-ordination of supplies within the new Northern Ireland took place in 1931 with the foundation of the Electricity Board for Northern Ireland. The ownership of the all public power stations in Northern Ireland was vested in the Electricity Board in 1949.

==== Belfast Corporation ====
Belfast Corporation Electricity Department gained the authority to generate and sell electricity under the provisions of the Belfast Electric Lighting Order 1890, confirmed by the Electric Lighting Orders Confirmation (No. 7) Act 1890. The corporation's area of supply was 83 square miles with a population of 502,000 (1958). By 1958 there were three electricity generating stations at Belfast East, Belfast West and East Bridge.

Belfast East power station (formerly Harbour power station) comprised eight turbo-alternator generating sets: 1 × 6 MW British Thomson-Houston, 2 × 15 MW, 1 × 18.75 MW and 4 × 30 MW Metropolitan Vickers, a total electricity capacity of 174.75 MW. These were supplied with up to 2,010,000 pounds per hour (253 kg/s) of steam from 18 Babcock and Stirling coal-fired boilers.

Belfast West power station (formerly Victoria power station) comprised five turbo-alternator generating sets: 2 × 30 MW Parsons low pressure sets and 3 × 60 MW Parsons high pressure sets, giving a total capacity of 240 MW. The low pressure sets were supplied with up to a total of 540,000 pounds per hour (68 kg/s) of steam at 650 psi and 925 °F (44.8 bar and 496 °C) from four Clarke Chapman tri-drum coal-fired boilers. The high pressure sets were supplied with steam at 900 psi and 925 °F (62 bar and 496 °C) from three Babcock & Wilcox radiant open pass type coal-fired boilers (each 220,000 lb/hr, 27.7 kg/s) and from six Mitchell two-drum coal-fired boilers (also each 220,000 lb/hr).

The East Bridge power station comprised two 6 MW turbo-alternators supplied with up to 120,000 lb/hr (15.1 kg/s) of steam from two Stirling coal-fired boilers.

From 1958 all the electricity generated was sold in bulk to the Northern Ireland Joint Electricity Committee (NIJEC), supplies for distribution by Belfast Corporation were purchased from the NIJEC. In the year ending 31 March 1958 the corporation exported 702,993 GWh to the NIJEC and purchased 541.750 GWh.

Consumers were supplied with a range of electric current: 220–380, 230–400 and 450–500 Volt AC and 220 and 440 Volt DC, and 550 V DC for traction. The growth in electricity supply is demonstrated in the table.

Belfast Corporation electricity supply statistics
Year (ended 31 March)	Consumers	Electricity sold, GWh	Revenue from sales, £
1946	92,254	374.229	1,547,718
1947	96,956	402.782	1,568,493
1948	102,748	426.937	1,725,653
1949	107,595	285.024	1,476,917
1950	114,618	315.471	1,637,869
1954	135,679	395.310	2,443,836
1955	138,866	427.465	2,661,437
1956	141,987	440.618	2,882,817
1957	146,730	464.307	3,297,157
1958	149,627	483.740	3,673,790
1960	155,066	531.603	4,272186
1961	157,278	572.210	4,534,187

==== Londonderry Corporation ====
Londonderry Corporation Electricity Department gained the authority to generate and sell electricity in Derry under the provisions of the Londonderry Electric Lighting Order 1891 confirmed by the Electric Lighting Orders Confirmation (No. 3) Act 1891. Further powers were given by the Londonderry Corporation Act 1918. Electricity supplies commenced in May 1894. The corporation's supply area was 3.6 square miles with a population (in 1958) of 502,000. In 1958 the generating station comprised: two 1,000 kW Westinghouse, one 4,000 kW and two 6,000 kW Metropolitan Vickers turbo-alternators. There were also six rotary converters for the DC supply. The turbo-alternators were supplied with steam from two Babcock & Wilcox and four Yarrow coal-fired boilers. Consumer supplies were 220–440 Volts DC and 220–380 Volts AC. The electricity supply from 1944 is shown in the table.

Londonderry Corporation electricity supply statistics
Year (ended 31 March)	Electricity sold, GWh	Revenue from sales, £
1944	24.641	126,903
1945	22.809	138,306
1946	21.827	126,441
1947	22.788	137,090
1948	20.998	132,095
1949	23.272	154,618
1954	27.685	215,197
1955	30.554	239,680
1956	35.260	277,532
1957	38.954	313,215
1958	42.722	354,394
1960	41.991	364,954
1961	33.763	322,306

==== Electricity Board for Northern Ireland ====
Electricity (Supply) Act (Northern Ireland) 1931
- Act of Parliament
- Parliament of Northern Ireland
- Long title: An Act to amend the law with respect to the supply of electricity.
- Citation: 21 & 22 Geo. 5. c. 9 (N.I.)

Dates
- Royal assent: 26 May 1931

The Electricity Board for Northern Ireland was established in 1931 under the provisions of the Electricity (Supply) Act (Northern Ireland) 1931. Its duty was to co-ordinate and improve the supply, distribution and sale of electricity. The board's area of supply was 5,200 square miles, with a population of 825,000 and 208,000 premises. Several electricity development schemes were scheduled in the 1931 act. For example, the first scheme included most of County Down and County Armagh and part of County Tyrone. The schemes culminated in an eighth scheme authorised in June 1947 to cover all remaining parts of Northern Ireland.

Electricity (Supply) Act (Northern Ireland) 1948
- Act of Parliament
- Parliament of Northern Ireland
- Citation: 1948 c. 18 (N.I.)

Dates
- Royal assent: 10 August 1948

Under the Electricity (Supply) Act (Northern Ireland) 1948 the Ministry of Commerce transferred to the board all the electricity property and assets held by the ministry including the power stations at Ballylumford and Larne. In 1957 the generating capacity of Ballylumford power station was 124.5 MW. There were 160,025 consumers, and 510.961 GWh of electricity were sold.

The station at Curran Point Larne was used for winter peak loads and maintenance outages. In 1957 it generated 48.9 MWh. The Board also owned a hydro-electric station at Limavady.

==== Northern Ireland Joint Electricity Committee ====
The Electricity (Supply) Act (Northern Ireland) 1948 also established the Northern Ireland Joint Electricity Committee (NIJEC). The committee had a duty to co-ordinate, control and improve the generation of electricity and primary transmission throughout Northern Ireland, to make adequate supplies available to electricity undertakings, and to encourage rural electrification. The Board and other undertakings were required to sell to the NIJEC the electricity generated at Ballylumford, Larne, Belfast and Londonderry power stations which the NIJEC bought at cost of production. The NIJEC resold electricity at a standard tariff to the distributing authorities.

Members of the committee were appointed by the Minister of Commerce. At its inception, the committee comprised Sir Eyre Gordon (chair), W. J. McC. Girvan (City general manager) and T. G. Christie (Northern Ireland Electricity Board). In 1959, the committee comprised C. A. R. Shillington (chair), R. P. Watson, and T. G. Christie.

The committee was abolished in 1967 upon the establishment of the Northern Ireland Joint Electricity Authority.

==== Northern Ireland Joint Electricity Authority ====
Electricity (Supply) Act (Northern Ireland) 1967
- Act of Parliament
- Parliament of Northern Ireland
- Citation: 1967 c. 11 (N.I.)

Dates
- Royal assent: 6 June 1967

The Northern Ireland Joint Electricity Authority was established in 1967 under the provisions of the Electricity (Supply) Act (Northern Ireland) 1967. The authority had wider powers to supervise and control generation, transmission and the preparation of generating plant programmes.

==== Northern Ireland Electricity Service (NIES) ====
Electricity Supply (Northern Ireland) Order 1972 (Note: Section 1(1).)
- Statutory Instrument
- Parliament of the United Kingdom
- Citation: SI 1972/1072
- Territorial extent: Northern Ireland

Dates
- Made: 19 July 1972
- Laid before Parliament: (Note: Section 1(2).)
Other legislation
Made under	Northern Ireland (Temporary Provisions) Act 1972
Amended by	Northern Ireland Assembly Disqualification Act 1975

Text of statute as originally enacted

On 1 April 1973, the Northern Ireland Electricity Service (NIES) was formed as a public utility to generate, transmit and supply electricity to Northern Ireland. It was established by the Electricity Supply (Northern Ireland) Order 1972 (SI 1972/1072).

During the Ulster Workers' Council strike in 1974, when electricity supplies were severely disrupted, the government considered generating power using a Royal Navy nuclear submarine in Belfast Lough but the idea was abandoned as being technically unfeasible.

=== Establishment and divestments ===
In 1991, the company was incorporated as a government-owned public limited company, Northern Ireland Electricity plc. In 1992 the power stations at Belfast Harbour, Ballylumford, Coolkeeragh and Kilroot were demerged and sold. In 1993 the remainder of NIE (transmission, supply and retail businesses) was privatised as Northern Ireland Electricity plc. In 1998, Northern Ireland Electricity plc became part of Viridian Group plc, with Northern Ireland Electricity a subsidiary of that holding company.

NIE Networks sold SONI, the operator of the transmission network, to EirGrid in March 2009 for £30 million.

=== Purchase by the ESB ===
On 7 July 2010, BBC News reported that the ESB was to purchase NIE for £1 billion. In September 2010, unionist politicians Peter Robinson and the then Sir Reg Empey wrote to the Taoiseach objecting to the transaction. They said it was "inappropriate" and that it amounted to the purchase of a "key component" of Northern Ireland's infrastructure. The ESB is a statutory corporation within the Republic of Ireland, whose board members are appointed by the Irish government. The acquisition was completed in December 2010 at a reported cost of £1.2bn.

NIE Networks remains an autonomous organisation with its own board and management teams, and separate regulation via the Northern Ireland Authority for Utility Regulation.

== Operations ==
=== Overview ===
The company's operations consist of ownership of the electricity transmission and distribution networks in Northern Ireland, consisting of 30,000 miles (49,000 kilometers) of overhead lines and underground cables, 75,000 pole-mounted transformers and 340 major substations. As of 2023, NIE Networks transports power to over 910,000 business and domestic customers.

NIE Networks is also the electricity distribution network operator for Northern Ireland. It is not the electricity transmission system operator, as this role is fulfilled by the System Operator for Northern Ireland (SONI), a subsidiary of EirGrid since 2009.

=== Incident management ===
NIE Networks has developed a set of procedures for dealing with major incidents, such as storms and snow, driven by the Boxing Day Storm of 1998, during which 162,000 customers were off-supply.

== See also ==
- List of Irish companies
- Energy policy of the United Kingdom
- Energy use and conservation in the United Kingdom
- Green electricity in the United Kingdom
- Electricity sector in Ireland
- List of power stations in Northern Ireland
