= Port Talbot Power Station =

- Country: Wales, United Kingdom
- Location: Port Talbot
- Coordinates: 51.596°N 3.781°W
- Status: Cancelled
- Construction cost: £500 million
- Owner: ESB International

Thermal power station
- Primary fuel: Natural gas
- Combined cycle?: Yes

Power generation
- Nameplate capacity: 1,100–1,300 MW

Port Talbot Power Station was a proposed 1,100–1,300 MW natural gas-fired power station in Port Talbot, situated in Neath Port Talbot county borough, Wales. A proposed 350 MW biomass power station would have been sited next door to it.

== Gas-fired power station ==
The power station was projected to cost £500 million, and be completed around 2012. It would have been built by ESB International. It would have been sited near the docks and steel works. It would have been a CCGT-type power station that runs on natural gas. In 2007 it was being reported that the "proposals are currently with the Department of Trade and Industry".

== Proposed wood-fired station ==
The £400 million biomass plant was granted planning permission in 2007, despite fierce opposition in the town. The plant would have been a wood-fired station. The plant was being developed by Prenergy Power. However by 2013 there appeared to be no prospect of construction starting.
