= Colmán of Kilroot =

Irish saint and abbot

Saint Colman of Kilroot
- Born: Ireland
- Died: 6th century Ireland
- Venerated in: Roman Catholicism
- Feast: 16 October

Colman mac Cathbaid is a sixth-century Irish saint who was an abbot and bishop of Kilroot (County Antrim), a minor see which was afterwards incorporated in the Diocese of Connor. He may have given his name to Kilmackevat (County Antrim).

In the Life of Mac Nise in the Codex Salmanticensis, the young Colman is saved from death by Bishop Mac Nisse of Connor, and instructed in the Holy Scriptures.

Colman was a disciple of St. Ailbe. At the direction of Ailbe, Colmán founded a church on the northern shore of Lough Laoigh. According to Bishop Healy, Colmán of Kilroot was the uncle of Colmán of Dromore.

Colman's feast has been kept on 16 October.
