= Energia Group =

Energy company in Ireland

- Company type: Private
- Industry: Energy
- Founded: 1998; 28 years ago
- Headquarters: Dublin, Ireland
- Revenue: €2,031 million (2019)
- Operating income: €119.9 million (2019)
- Owner: I Squared Capital (2016–2026); Ardian (2026–present)
- Number of employees: 795 (2019)
- Subsidiaries: Power NI; Energia
- Website: energiagroup.com

Energia Group (formerly Viridian Group) is an Irish energy company with interests across the island of Ireland. From a consumer perspective, Energia Group organises itself into two main groups: Power NI and Energia.

== Businesses ==
Energia Group's strategy is strongly focused on Irish energy markets. Its businesses are organised in two main groups: Power NI and Energia.

=== Power NI ===
Power NI supplies over 600,000 homes and businesses in Northern Ireland with electricity.

Power NI Power Procurement Business manages the group's power purchase agreements.

Power NI was the former customer supply business of Northern Ireland Electricity (NIE), known originally as NIE Supply and then, after its separation from the rest of NIE, as NIE Energy. Both it and the Power Procurement Business "were separated from NIE on 1 November 2007 in accordance with the requirements of the 2003 EU Electricity Directive which required the independence of the distribution system operation function." In 2010, Viridian sold NIE, including the NIE name, to the Electricity Supply Board (the ESB) - the state-owned electricity company in the Republic of Ireland. As a result, NIE Energy was no longer allowed to use the NIE name, and it rebranded as Power NI on 25 July 2011.

=== Energia ===
Energia was founded in 1999 and became the first independent supplier in Northern Ireland. Within a year it had entered the Irish business electricity market. By 2003, Energia had established itself as Ireland's leading independent energy business supplying over 30% of large industrial electricity requirements. Energia now supplies over 250,000 homes in the Republic of Ireland.

=== Energia Renewables and Flexible Generation ===
Energia Flexible Generation generates electricity through Huntstown power station, whilst Energia Renewables generates via wind power across the island of Ireland.

== History ==
Energia Group (formerly Viridian Group) was formed in 1998 as a holding company for Northern Ireland Electricity plc (NIE), the purpose of the reorganisation was to "step up the move into unregulated markets and for expansion overseas." NIE was a public utility which was privatised in 1993. Formerly a vertically integrated monopoly, NIE's power stations were demerged and sold prior to privatisation.

On 6 October 2006, Viridian's board agreed the acquisition of the group by ElectricInvest, a company owned by the international investment firm Arcapita. The acquisition, which valued Viridian at £1.62 billion, was completed on 8 December 2006.

On 6 July 2010, Viridian agreed to sell NIE - including NIE Powerteam, but excluding NIE Energy - to the Electricity Supply Board (the ESB) in the Republic of Ireland. The acquisition was completed in December 2010.

In 2016, I Squared Capital, a US infrastructure investment firm, acquired the company for €1 billion.

In 2025, Energia Group was acquired by the French private equity firm, Ardian, in a deal estimated at more than €2.5 billion. The European Union approved the sale in February 2026.

== See also ==
- Energy policy of the United Kingdom
- Energy policy of the European Union
- Energy use and conservation in the United Kingdom
- Green electricity in the United Kingdom
- Electricity sector in Ireland
