= IEC 60269 =

Standard for low-voltage power fuses

In electrical engineering, IEC 60269 is a set of technical standards for low-voltage power fuses. The standard is in four volumes, which describe general requirements, fuses for industrial and commercial applications, fuses for residential applications, and fuses to protect semiconductor devices. The IEC standard unifies several national standards, thereby improving the interchangeability of fuses in international trade. All fuses of different technologies tested to meet IEC standards will have similar time-current characteristics, which simplifies design and maintenance.

- IEC 60269-1 – Low-voltage fuses – Part 1: General requirements
- IEC 60269-2 – Low-voltage fuses – Part 2: Supplementary requirements for fuses for use by authorized persons (fuses mainly for industrial application) – Examples of standardized systems of fuses A to I
- IEC 60269-3 – Low-voltage fuses – Part 3: Supplementary requirements for fuses for use by unskilled persons (fuses mainly for household and similar applications) – Examples of standardized systems of fuses A to F
- IEC 60269-4 – Low-voltage fuses – Part 4: Supplementary requirements for fuse-links for the protection of semiconductor devices
- IEC 60269-5 – Low-voltage fuses – Part 5: Guidance for the application of low-voltage fuses
- IEC 60269-6 – Low-voltage fuses – Part 6: Supplementary requirements for fuse-links for the protection of solar photovoltaic energy systems
- IEC 60269-7 – Low-voltage fuses – Part 7: Supplementary requirements for fuse-links for the protection of batteries and battery systems

In IEC standards, the replaceable element is called a fuse link and the assembly of fuse link and fuse holder is called a fuse. North American standards call the replaceable element only the fuse.

== Application categories and time-current characteristics ==
IEC 60269 unifies the electrical characteristics of fuses that are dimensionally interchangeable with fuses built to earlier British, German, French or Italian standards. The standard identifies application categories which classify the time-current characteristic of each type of fuse. The application category is a two-digit code.

- The first letter is a if the fuse is for short-circuit protection only; an associated device must provide overload protection.
- The first letter is g if the fuse is intended to operate even with currents as low as those that cause it to blow in one hour. These are considered general-purpose fuses for protection of wires.

The second letter indicates the type of equipment or system to be protected:

- Bat – Batteries and battery energy storage systems as per 60269–7
- D – North American time-delay fuses for motor circuits, UL 248 fuses
- G – General purpose protection of wires and cables
- M – Motors
- N – Conductors sized to North American practice, UL 248 fuses
- PV – Solar photovoltaic arrays as per 60269–6
- R, S – Rectifiers or semiconductors as per 60269–5
- Tr – Transformers

Any fuses built to the IEC 60269 standard and carrying the same application category (for example, gG or aM) will have similar electrical characteristics, time-current characteristics, and power dissipation as any other, even if the fuses are made in the packages standardized to the earlier national standards. Fuses of the same application category can be substituted for each other provided the voltage rating of the circuit does not exceed the fuse rating.

The tests recommended on Fuses by IEC 60269 are:

1. Temperature rise & power dissipation test
2. Non-fusing & Fusing test
3. Verification of rated current test
4. Overload test
5. Verification of Time Current Characteristics and Gates

== D type fuses ==
Diagram of an installed DIAZED fuse

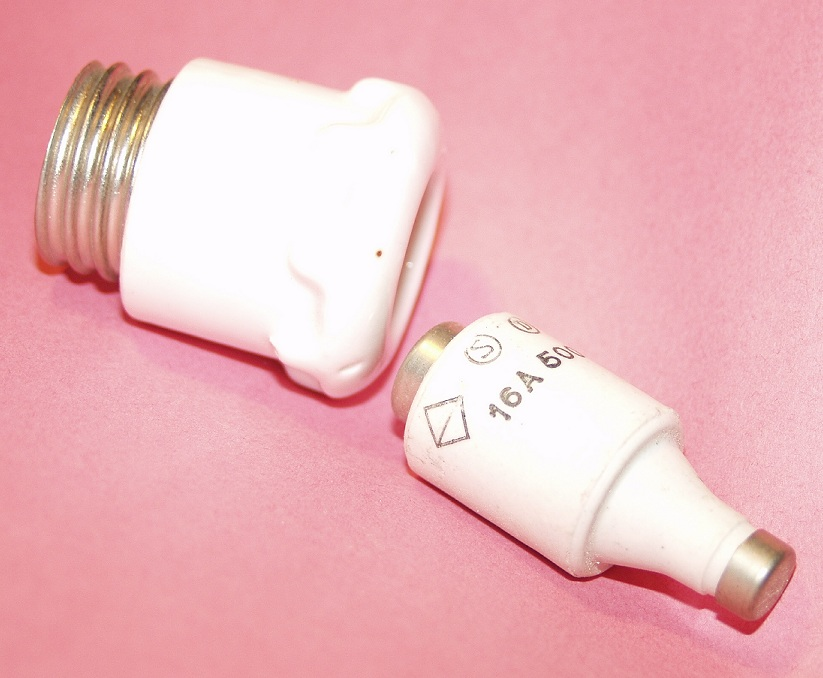
DIAZED fuse element D II (right) and screw cap

Operation of a D0-type (NEOZED) fuse switch-disconnector without screw base and with all-pole disconnection

D-type (Diazed, from German "Diametral abgestuftes zweiteiliges Edisongewinde" for "diametrically graded two-part Edison thread") fuse cartridges have a bottle-shaped ceramic body with metal end caps and are used with screw-in fuse holders. Introduced in 1909 by Siemens, they are available today in five different body sizes, with ratings from 2 A up to 200 A (see table), though only D II and D III fuses are commonly used. The designation of a size consists of the letter D and a Roman numeral. Higher-voltage types rated up to 750 V have increased clearance distances and are longer than lower-voltage-rated fuses. They are available with interrupting ratings up to 50kA RMS, and are intended for use as incoming main protection from an electrical supply utility.

D0-type (Neozed) fuses were introduced in 1967 and use the same concept, but have a smaller, cylindrical body. They are available in three different sizes with ratings from 2 A up to 100 A (see table).

Fuse holders may be secured by screws to a panel, attached to bus bars, or mounted on DIN rails. For the Neozed fuses, there are also fuse bases with integrated disconnecting switches. Changing fuses with the circuit off increases the safety of the user. With new versions of these load disconnecting switches, the fuse cartridges are no longer screwed, but are held by spring clips.

Traditional Diazed fuse holders are made as a conducting metal envelope covered with non-conducting porcelain cover. Under mechanical stress it is possible for the cover to crack partially or fully, uncovering the conducting element. It may happen if a fuse holder was accidentally dropped or someone was using too much force to screw it in. Uncovered metal envelopes present a serious risk of shock and should be replaced immediately under extreme precautions by trained personnel.

The smaller end cap (the "top" of the bottle) has a diameter that varies with the fuse rating: higher ratings have wider end caps. The fixed part of the fuse holder contains a (usually colour-coded) gauge ring, which will accept end caps up to a certain diameter. It is therefore not possible to fit a fuse of a higher rating than allowed for by the gauge ring. The size of the gauge ring is determined by the current rating of the circuit to be protected. Gauge rings are intended to be changed only by authorized personnel.

The larger end cap (the "bottom" of the bottle) has at its centre a small spring-loaded button retained by a thin wire, which serves as a "fuse blown" indicator. When the fuse blows, the wire breaks and the indicator button is ejected by the spring. A missing or displaced indicator thus pinpoints a blown fuse. The removable part of the fuse holder has a small window to allow inspection of the indicator without removal of the fuse. The indicator button usually has a coloured dot indicating the fuse rating (see table).

D-type fuses are used for protection of circuits up to 500 V AC in residential and commercial installations, and occasionally for the protection of electric motors. The more modern D0-type fuses, by contrast, are designed for 400 V, as this is now the maximum voltage of a European three-phase household installation. This is also one reason why they are more compact than the older D-type fuse inserts. The most common operating class is gG (general purpose, formerly gL), but other classes are available. A gG class fuse will typically blow within 2–5 seconds at five times the rated current, and within 0.1–0.2 seconds at ten times the rated current.

Gauge rings and fuse indicators are colour coded for the nominal current:

2 A	4 A	6 A	10 A	13 A	16 A	20 A	25 A
Pink	Brown	Green	Red	Black	Grey	Blue	Yellow
32 A	35 A	40 A	50 A	63 A	80 A	100 A	
Black	Black	Black	White	Copper	Silver	Red	

125 A	160 A	200 A
Yellow	Copper	Blue

=== D-system (DIAZED) ===
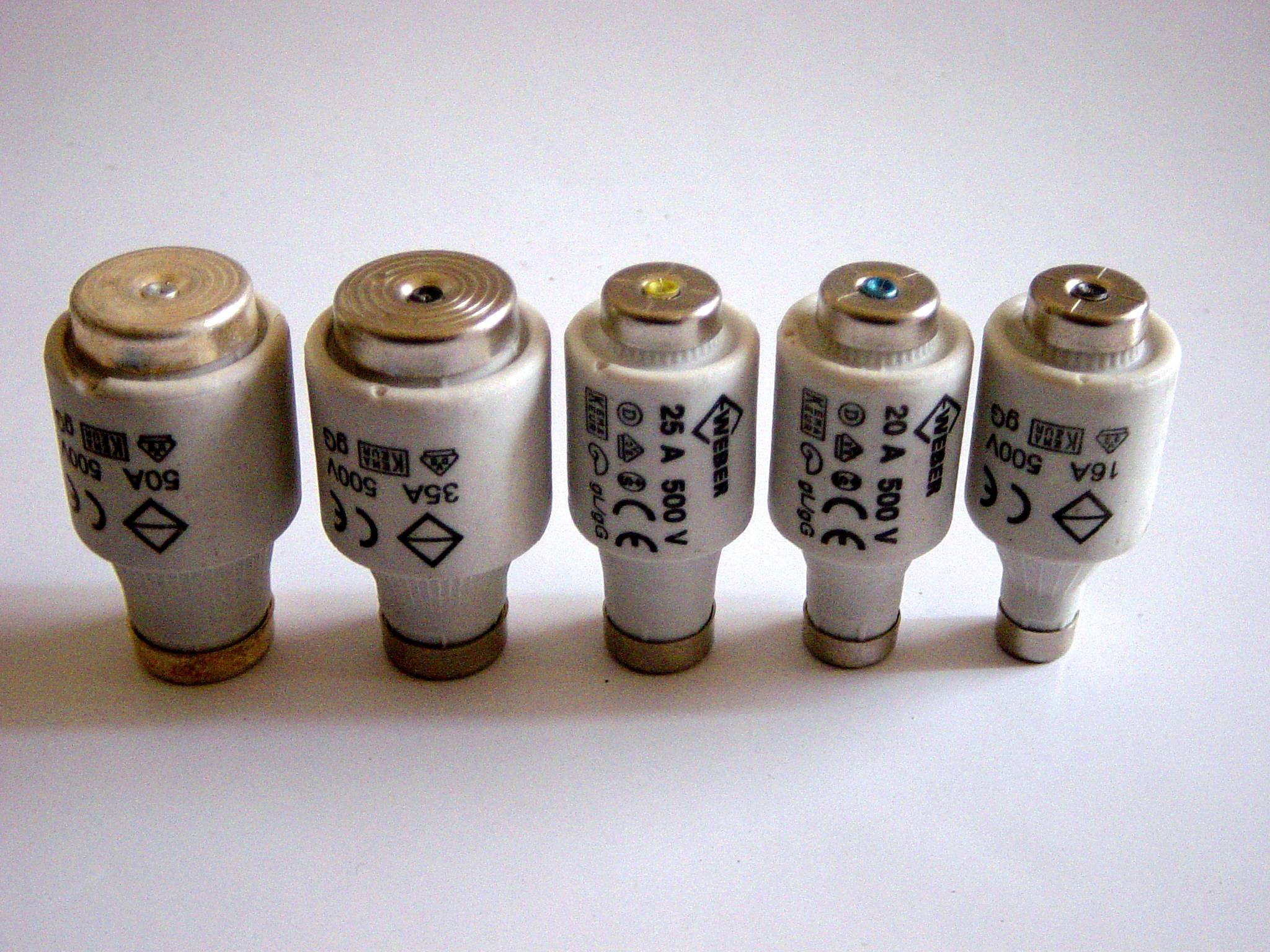
D III fuses 50 A, 35 A D II fuses 25 A, 20 A, 16 A

Size	Designated current	Thread
D I (Swiss)	2 A, 4 A, 6 A, 10 A, 16 A	SE21
D I (NDz)	2 A, 4 A, 6 A, 10 A, 16 A, 20 A, 25 A	E16
D II	2 A, 4 A, 6 A, 10 A, 13 A, 16 A, 20 A, 25 A	E27
D III	35 A, 40 A, 50 A, 63 A	E33
D IV	80 A, 100 A	G 1¼″
D V	125 A, 160 A, 200 A	G 2″

- The sizes D IV and D V are rarely used
- D I and D V are not part of IEC 60269 (meet outdated national standards)

D01 fuse cartridge 16A (Neozed)

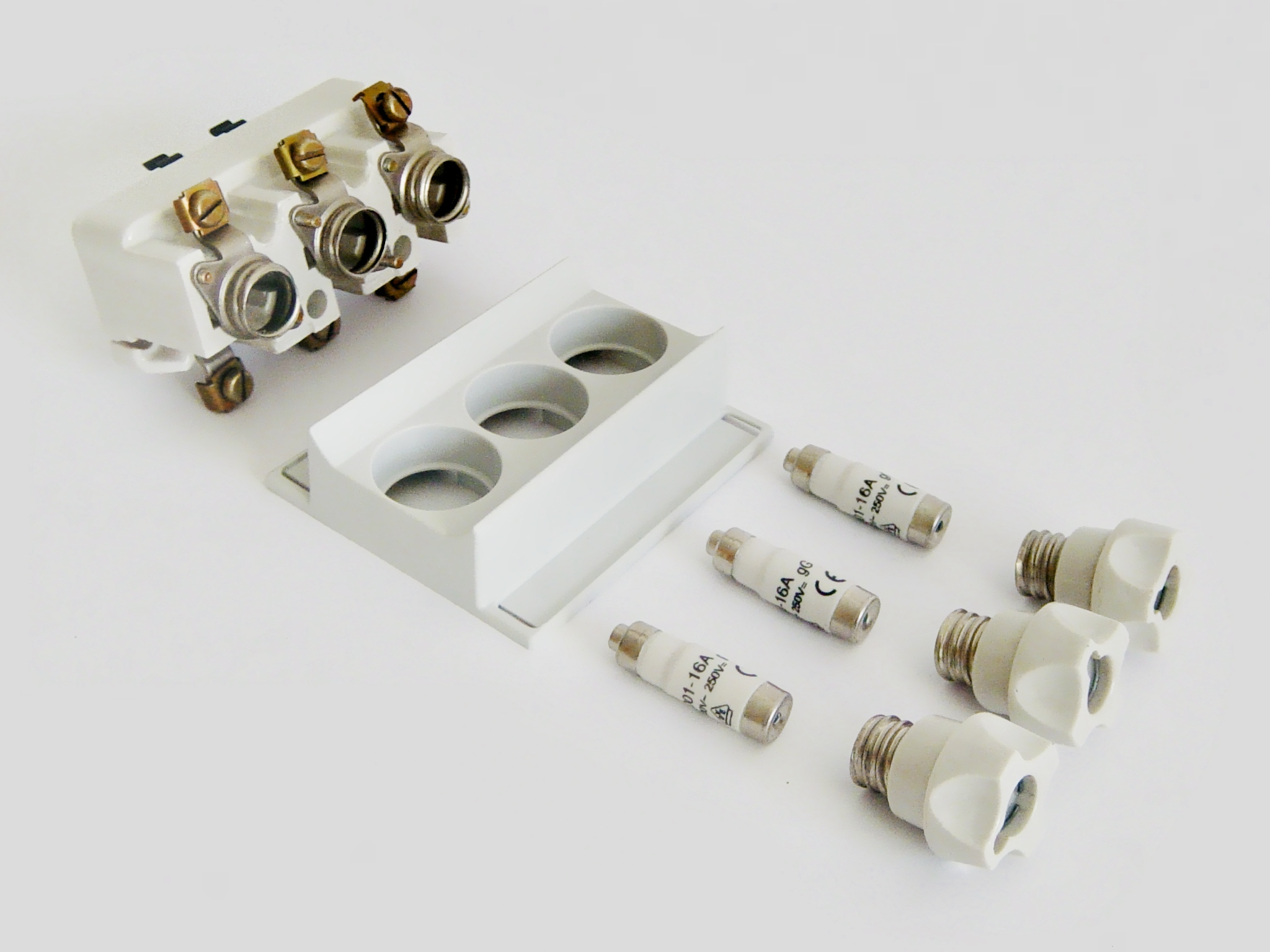
Neozed Fuse block for 3-phase AC

=== D0-System (NEOZED) ===
Fuses of the D0 system (read as D zero) or NEOZED are smaller than the DIAZED fuses. NEOZED fuses are divided into three sizes.

Size	Rated current	Thread
D01	2 A, 4 A, 6 A, 10 A, 13 A, 16 A	E14
D02	20 A, 25 A, 32 A, 35 A, 40 A, 50 A, 63 A	E18
D03	80 A, 100 A	M 30 × 2

The D03 size is used very rarely, because with these high currents NH fuses have proven to be more reliable. In circuits with a very high prospective short-circuit current level (more than 50kA), D-fuses cannot be used and type NH fuses are used instead.

D01 is nowadays uncommon because miniature circuit breakers are usually used instead for these currents.

== NH fuses ==
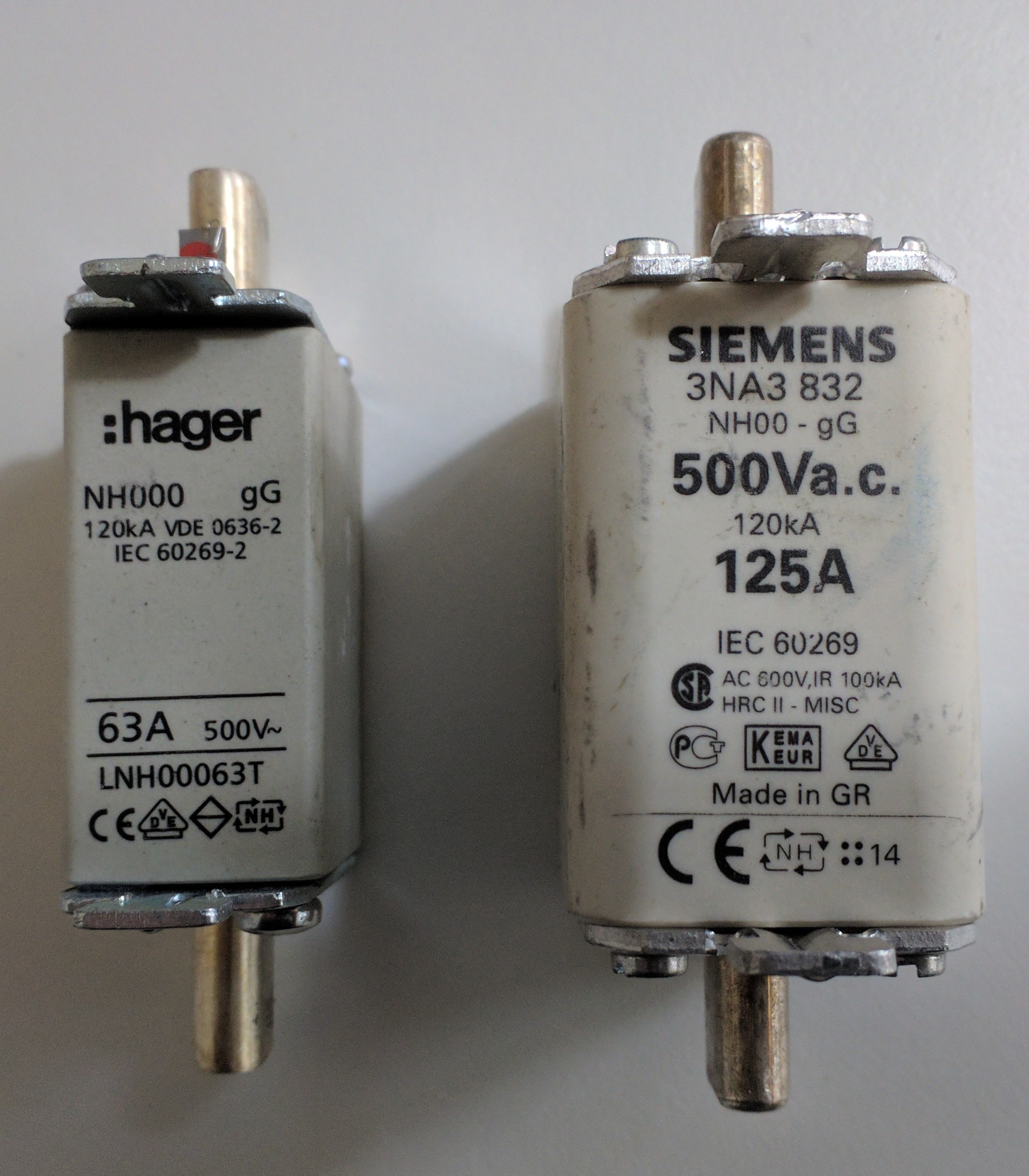
NH fuses of sizes 000 and 00, rated 63A and 125A

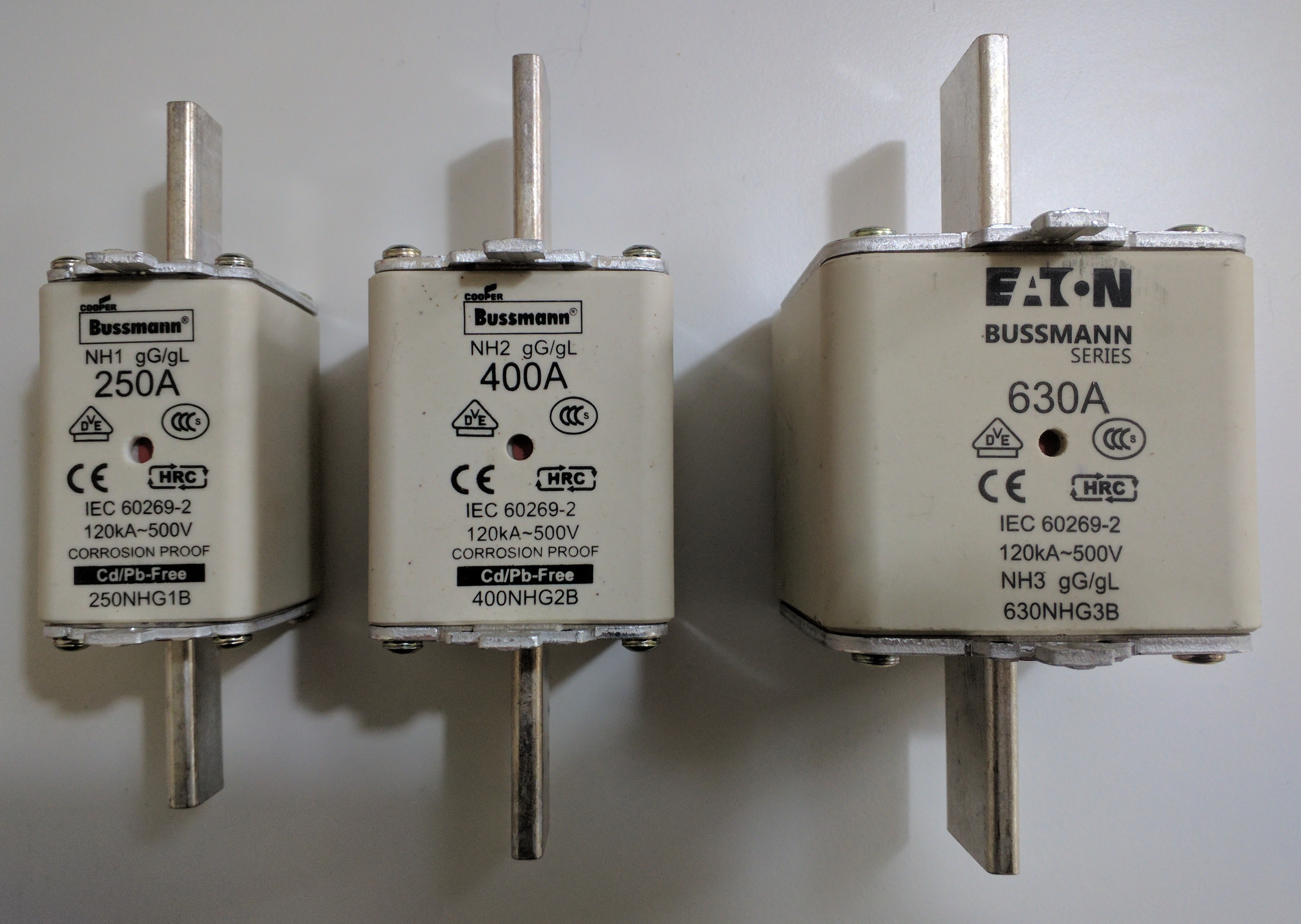
NH fuses of sizes 1, 2 and 3, rated 250A, 400A and 630A

NH fuses have a square or oblong body and blade-style terminals. These fuses are larger and have higher ratings than the screw type fuses, exceeding 100 kA. NH fuses are widespread in industrial plants as well as in public mains electricity applications, e.g., in electrical substations and electrical distribution boards, or in house junction boxes in buildings.

NH fuses can be changed with power on the circuit, but this requires special training, special tools, and personal protective equipment. An isolation protection mat and isolating gloves may be necessary. Pulling any fuse cartridge under load can cause an electric arc, which may cause serious and fatal injuries without protection equipment. NH disconnecting switches facilitate the safety of cartridge replacement.

NH fuses are manufactured in several current rating ranges.

Size	Current range (A)	Approx. blade length (mm)
00/000	6–160	78
0	6–160	125
1	80–250	135
2	125–400	150
3	315–630	150
4	500–1,000	200
4a	500–1,250	200

== British domestic fuses ==
In British residential installations, cylindrical fuses with a diameter of 1/4 inch and a length of 1 inch (Ø 6.3 × 25.4 mm) in compliance with British Standard BS 1362 are found inside a standard UK 13 A plug. The specification calls for sand-filled fuses with a ceramic body and metallic contacts at the ends with a 5.5 mm length.
