= ESB Group =

Irish electric utility

Electricity Supply Board
- Type: Statutory corporation
- Industry: Energy generation; Electricity transmission; Electricity distribution
- Founded: 1927; 99 years ago
- Headquarters: Dublin, Ireland
- Area served: Worldwide
- Key people: Paddy Hayes (CEO); Jerry O’Sullivan (Deputy Chief Executive)
- Services: Electricity; Bandwidth solutions; Engineering consultants
- Revenue: €3.7bn (2019)
- Operating income: €682m (2019)
- Total assets: €14.1bn (2019)
- Owner: Government of Ireland (95%); Employee Share Ownership Trust (5%)
- Number of employees: 7,870
- Subsidiaries: ESB Networks; Electric Ireland; ESB International; ESB Energy; Northern Ireland Electricity (NIE); ESB Telecom; ESB ecars; ESB Generation and Wholesale Markets
- Website: Official website

The Electricity Supply Board (ESB; Irish: Bord Soláthair an Leictreachais) is a state owned (95%; the rest are owned by employees) electricity company based in Ireland with operations worldwide. While historically a monopoly, the ESB now operates as a commercial semi-state concern in a "liberalised" and competitive market. It is a statutory corporation whose members are appointed by the Government of Ireland.

== Business areas ==
The ESB is composed of several distinct, separate and legally demarcated companies. By business area, the principal companies are:

ESB Networks Limited manages construction and maintenance of the electricity transmission system. (The transmission system operator is an independent state company, EirGrid).

ESB Generation and Wholesale Markets (ESB GWM) operates a portfolio of power stations across the country, along with holdings in wind and other renewables.

Electric Ireland is a regulated supply company, one of fourteen companies (as of 10 October 2021) operating in the domestic market. Since 4 April 2011 the Commission for Energy Regulation no longer sets the company's prices; the trade-off for this was that the division was required to change its name from ESB to Electric Ireland, to "remove confusion" between the ESB's role as operator of the electricity network and a supplier in that market. The previous name, ESB Independent Energy, was dropped in January 2012.

ESB International Limited is responsible for the company's unregulated activities, principally providing electrical engineering consultancy services around the world. It has holdings in many areas, such as power-generation joint ventures, renewables development, and computing consultancy.

Northern Ireland Electricity (NIE) is responsible for the operation and maintenance of the electricity network in Northern Ireland, and has been part of the ESB since they purchased it from Viridian in December 2010. However, the ESB does not own the former supply business of NIE, which was retained by Viridian.

== History ==
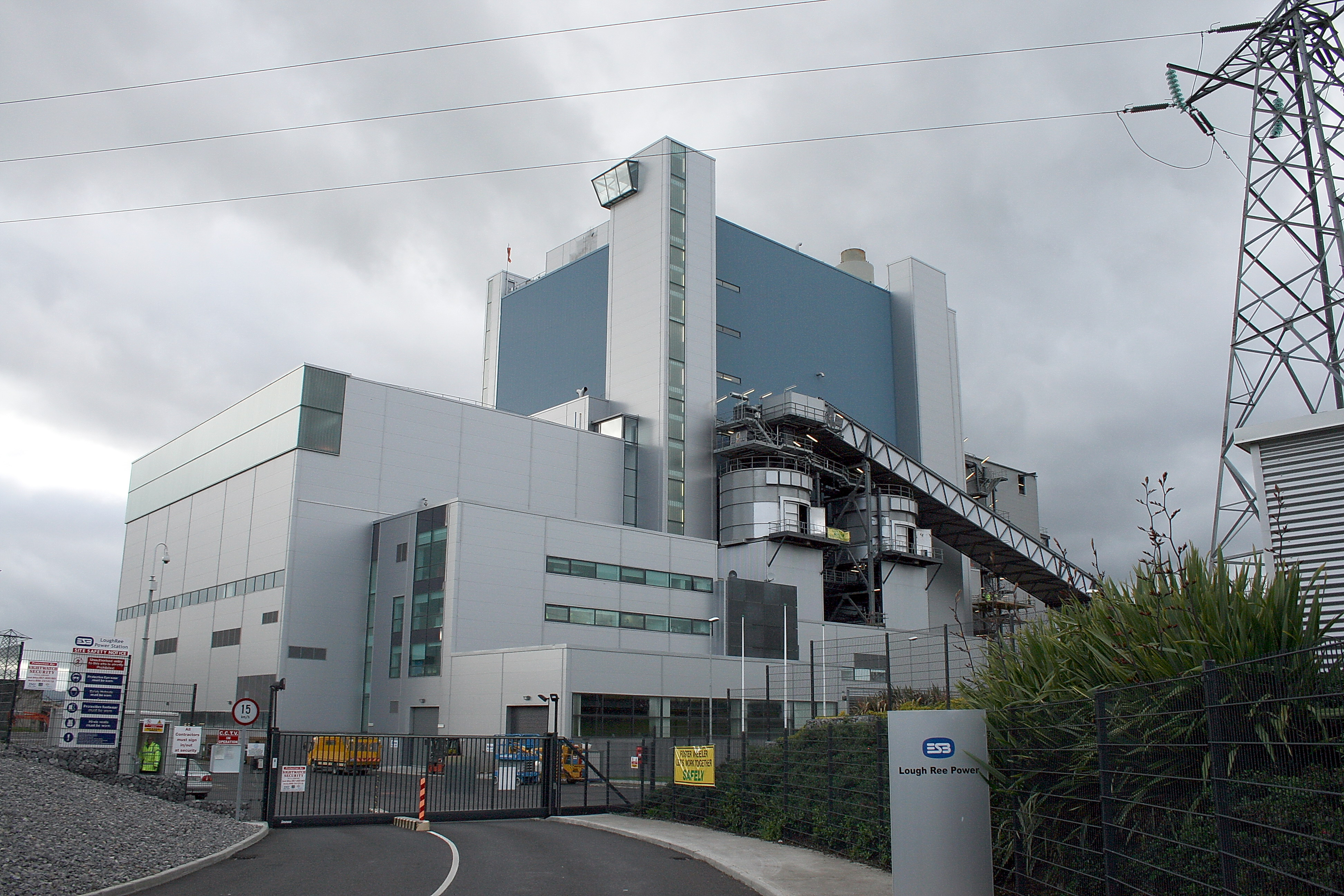
Lough Ree Power Station

The ESB was established by the fledgling Irish Free State government under the Electricity (Supply) Act, 1927 to manage Ireland's electricity supply after the successful Shannon Scheme at Ardnacrusha. The scheme was Ireland's first large-scale electricity plant – and at the time, it provided 80% of the total energy demands of Ireland. To give an idea of the growth in demand, the output of Ardnacrusha is now approximately two per cent of national peak demand for power.

By 1937, plans were being finalised for the construction of several more hydro-electric plants. The plans called for stations at Poulaphouca, Golden Falls, Leixlip (all in Leinster), Clady, Cliff and Cathaleen's Fall (between Belleek and Ballyshannon in County Donegal), Carrigadrohid and Inniscarra (in County Cork). All these new plants were completed by 1949, and together harnessed approximately 75% of Ireland's inland water power potential. Many of these plants are still in operation; however, as could be expected with continuing growth in demand, their combined capacity falls far short of Ireland's modern needs.

With Ireland's towns and cities benefiting from electricity, the new government pushed the idea of Rural Electrification. Between 1946 and 1979, the ESB connected in excess of 420,000 customers in rural Ireland. The Rural Electrification Scheme has been described as "the Quiet Revolution" because of the major socio-economic change it brought about. The process was greatly helped in 1955 by the Electricity Supply Amendment Act, 1955.

In 1947, the ESB, needing ever more generation capacity, built the North Wall station on a 7.5-acre (30,000 m^{2}) site in Dublin's industrial port area on the north side of the River Liffey on the site of an old oil refinery. The original station consisted of one 12.5 MW steam turbine that was originally purchased for a power station at Portarlington but instead used at North Wall. Other power stations built around this time included the peat fired stations at Portarlington, County Laois, and Allenwood in County Kildare.

Because of the risks of becoming dependent on imported fuel sources and the potential for harvesting and utilising indigenous peat, the ESB – in partnership with Bord na Móna – established those stations and ESB also built Lanesboro power station in 1958. Located in County Longford, the plant burns peat, cut by Bord na Móna in the bogs of the Irish midlands. In 1965 the Shannonbridge station was commissioned. It is located in County Offaly. The two stations have been replaced by new peat-fired stations near the same locations, and peat is also used to power the independent Edenderry Power plant, in County Offaly.

As in most countries, energy consumption is low at night and high during the day. Aware of the substantial waste of night-time capacity, the ESB commissioned the Turlough Hill pumped storage hydro-electric station in 1968. This station, located in County Wicklow, pumps water uphill at night with the excess energy created by other stations, and releases it downhill during the day to turn turbines. The plant can generate up to 292 MW of power – but output is limited in terms of hours because of the storage capacity of the reservoir.

The 1970s brought about a continued increase in Ireland's industrialisation and with it, a greater demand for energy. This new demand was to be met by the construction of the country's two largest power stations – Poolbeg in 1971 and Moneypoint in 1979. The latter, in County Clare, remains Ireland's only coal-burning plant and can produce 915 MW – just shy of the 1015 MW capacity of Poolbeg. In 2002 and 2003, new independent stations were constructed – Huntstown Power (north Dublin) and Dublin Bay Power (Ringsend, Dublin).

In 1991, the ESB established the ESB Archive to store historical documents relating to the company and its impact on Irish life.

On 8 September 2003, two of the last remaining places in Ireland unconnected to the national grid – Inishturbot and Inishturk islands (off the coast of Galway)- were finally connected to the mains supply. Some islands are still powered by small diesel-run power stations.

60 wind farms are currently connected to the power system (July 2006) and have the capacity to generate 590 MW of power, depending on wind conditions. These wind farms are mainly owned by independent companies and landowners.

On 16 March 2005, the ESB announced that it was to sell its ShopElectric (ESB Retail) chain of shops, with the exception of the Dublin Fleet Street and Cork Academy Street outlets, to Bank of Scotland (Ireland), converting them into main street banks. Existing staff were offered positions as bank tellers.

On 27 March 2008, the ESB announced a €22bn capital investment programme in renewable energy technology, with the aim to halve its carbon emissions within 12 years and achieve carbon net-zero by 2035.

== EirGrid ==
On 1 July 2006, a new state owned company, EirGrid plc, separate from all parties in the Irish electricity sector, took over responsibility for the operation of the Irish national grid. It has its own separate board and it reports to the CER and its main shareholder, the Irish government. It was established as the operator of the Irish transmission system with ownership remaining with ESB Networks. On 12 March 2007, the Irish Government Policy on Energy stated that ownership of the transmission system would be vested in EirGrid from end 2008. EirGrid is responsible for balancing electricity consumption and generation and for the development of the power transmission system. Eirgrid, in conjunction with System Operator Northern Ireland, operates the all-island wholesale electricity market.

== Facilities ==
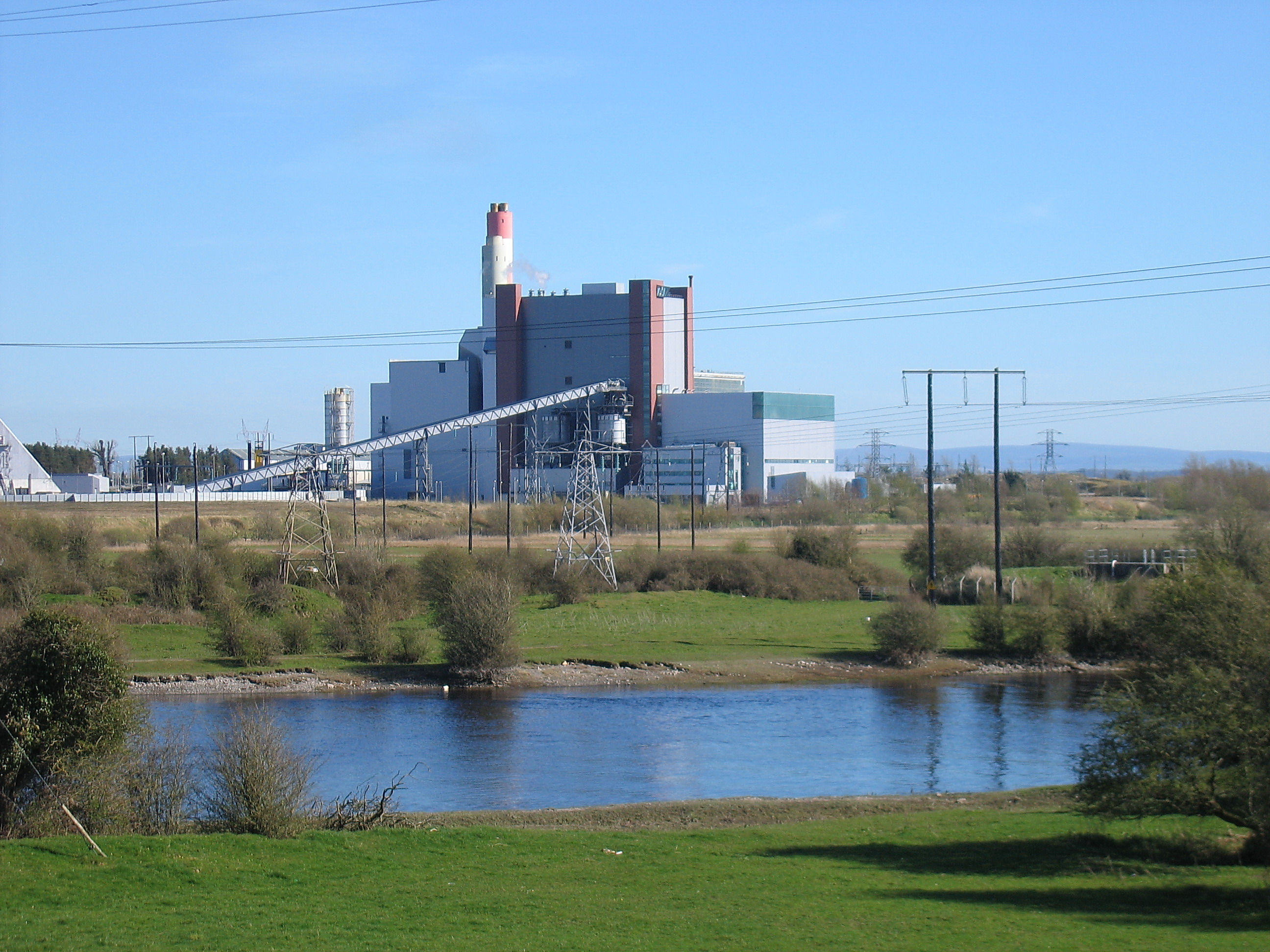
West Offaly Power Station

Generation Capacity MW	Plant	Location	Fuel	Year First Commissioned
963	Aghada	County Cork	Natural gas and distillate	1980
915	Moneypoint	County Clare	Coal or Oil	1985
470	Poolbeg	County Dublin	Natural gas with distillate as an emergency back-up	1971
292	Turlough Hill	County Wicklow	Pumped-storage hydroelectricity	1968
262	North Wall	County Dublin	Natural gas or distillate	1947
96	Marina	County Cork	Natural gas and distillate	1954
86	Ardnacrusha	County Clare	Hydroelectricity	1929
65	Erne (Cathaleen's Fall and Cliff)	County Donegal	Hydroelectricity	1950
30	Poulaphouca	County Wicklow	Hydroelectricity	1938
19	Inniscarra Dam	County Cork	Hydroelectricity	1957
8	Carrigadrohid	County Cork	Hydroelectricity	1957
4	Golden Falls	County Kildare	Hydroelectricity	1943
4	Leixlip	County Kildare	Hydroelectricity	1938
4	Clady	County Donegal	Hydroelectricity	1959

Tarbert and Great Island were sold to Endesa in 2008 under the asset-divestment strategy agreed with the CER. This aims to lessen ESB GWM's market dominant position.

The ESB also has significant holdings in wind generation, principally through its wholly owned subsidiary, Hibernian Wind Power.

== Former facilities ==
Generation Capacity MW	Plant	Location	Fuel	Year First Commissioned	Year Decommissioned
90	Ferbane power station	County Offaly	Peat	1957	2003
80	Rhode Power Station	County Offaly	Peat	1960	2003
150	West Offaly Power Station	County Offaly	Peat	2004	2020
100	Lough Ree Power Station	County Longford	Peat	2004	2020

== Proposed facilities ==
Generation Capacity MW	Plant	Location	Fuel	Year Proposed
1100–1300	Port Talbot Power Station	Port Talbot	Natural gas	

== Technical standards for electrical equipment ==
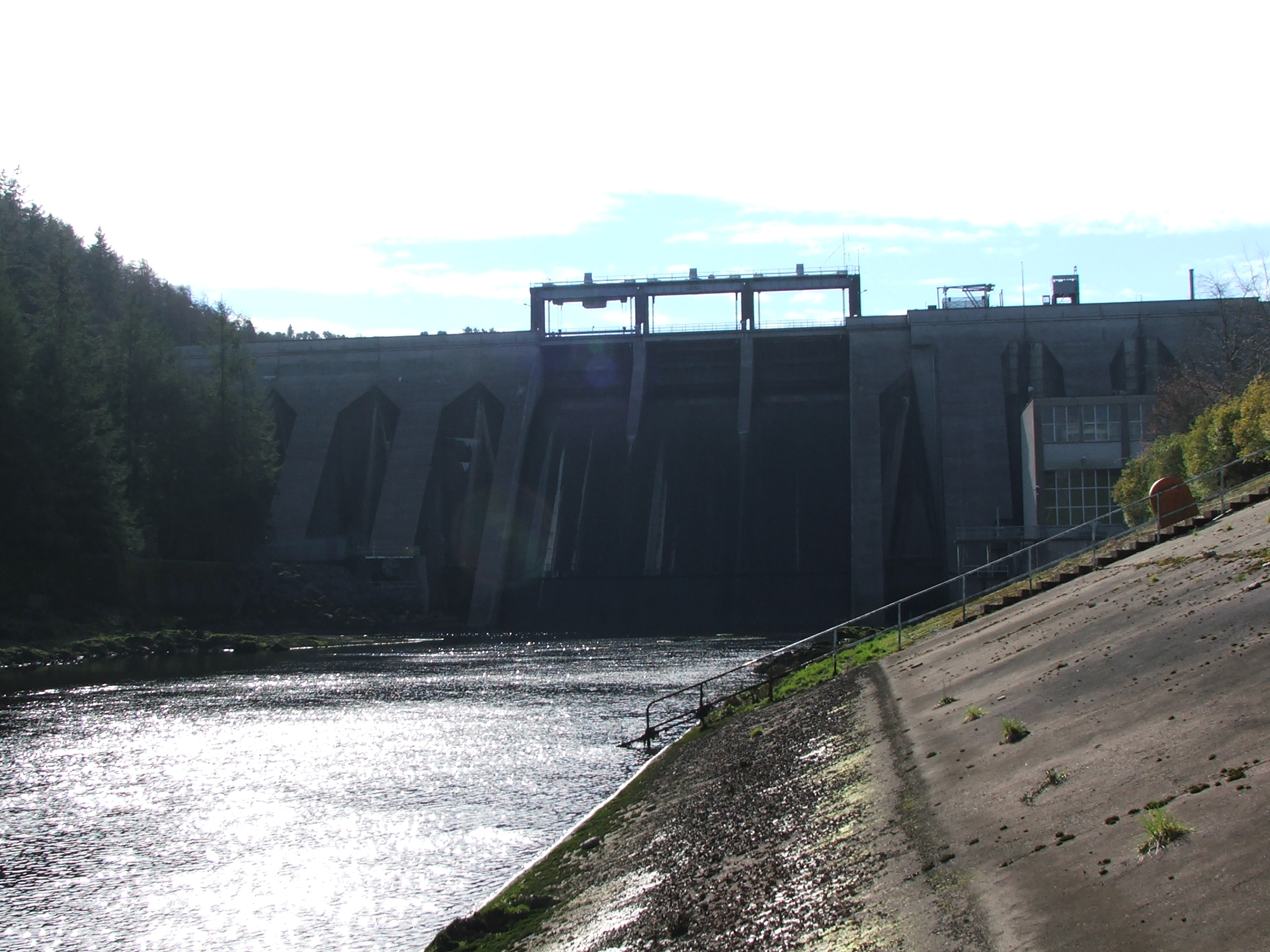
Inniscarra hydro-electric dam, River Lee, Co. Cork

The Shannon Scheme was the start of the ESB's heavy reliance on German and Swedish electro-technology. Siemens, AEG and ASEA (Now ABB) equipment was used throughout the Irish generation and distribution system. The Irish system standardised on the 220 volt 50 Hz (now 230 volt) single phase and 380 volt (now 400 volt) three-phase supply systems which had been developed by Siemens and AEG in Germany. Residential installations followed a mixture of British (BS) and German (VDE) & (DIN) standards.

Siemens standard Diazed and the more modern Neozed fuses remain the standard type of fuse used in domestic and industrial installations and modern circuit breakers comply with German DIN standards.

British core colours red (live), black (neutral) and green (earth/ground) were used. These were later updated to brown (live), blue (neutral) and green-and-yellow (earth/ground) as per CENELEC and European standards.

Three-phase core colours also comply with EU standards: brown (L1), black (L2), grey (L3), blue (neutral), green & yellow (earth/ground)

British wiring accessories have generally been used in residential and light commercial installations e.g. junction boxes, light switches, wires and cables etc. However, in recent years European standard wiring accessories are beginning to replace some of these.

In industrial installations, Irish standards have always tended to follow German (DIN) and (VDE) norms.

=== Earthing/grounding system ===
- TN-C-S is preferred. This is referred to in Ireland as a "neutralised" supply. Most homes and businesses are connected to such a system.
  Where this system is used, all the metal pipework must be bonded i.e. connected to the system's earth/ground creating an equipotential zone. In such an installation earth straps and yellow and green earth wires can be seen connected to pipework under sinks, in heating systems etc.
- TT system is used where TN-C-S earthing is not possible due to the design of the local distribution network, or the geology. This system is referred to as 'unneutralised' or 'not neutralised'.

Where a TT network connection is used, the entire supply must be protected by an RCD

Converting a TT supply to a TN-C supply "neutralisation" may only be carried out by an ESB engineer with the approval of ESB Networks. Under no circumstances should a homeowner, or an electrical contractor make any connection between the Earth/Ground and Neutral. To do so inappropriately could expose people to a risk of serious shock or electrocution.

=== Plugs and socket outlets ===
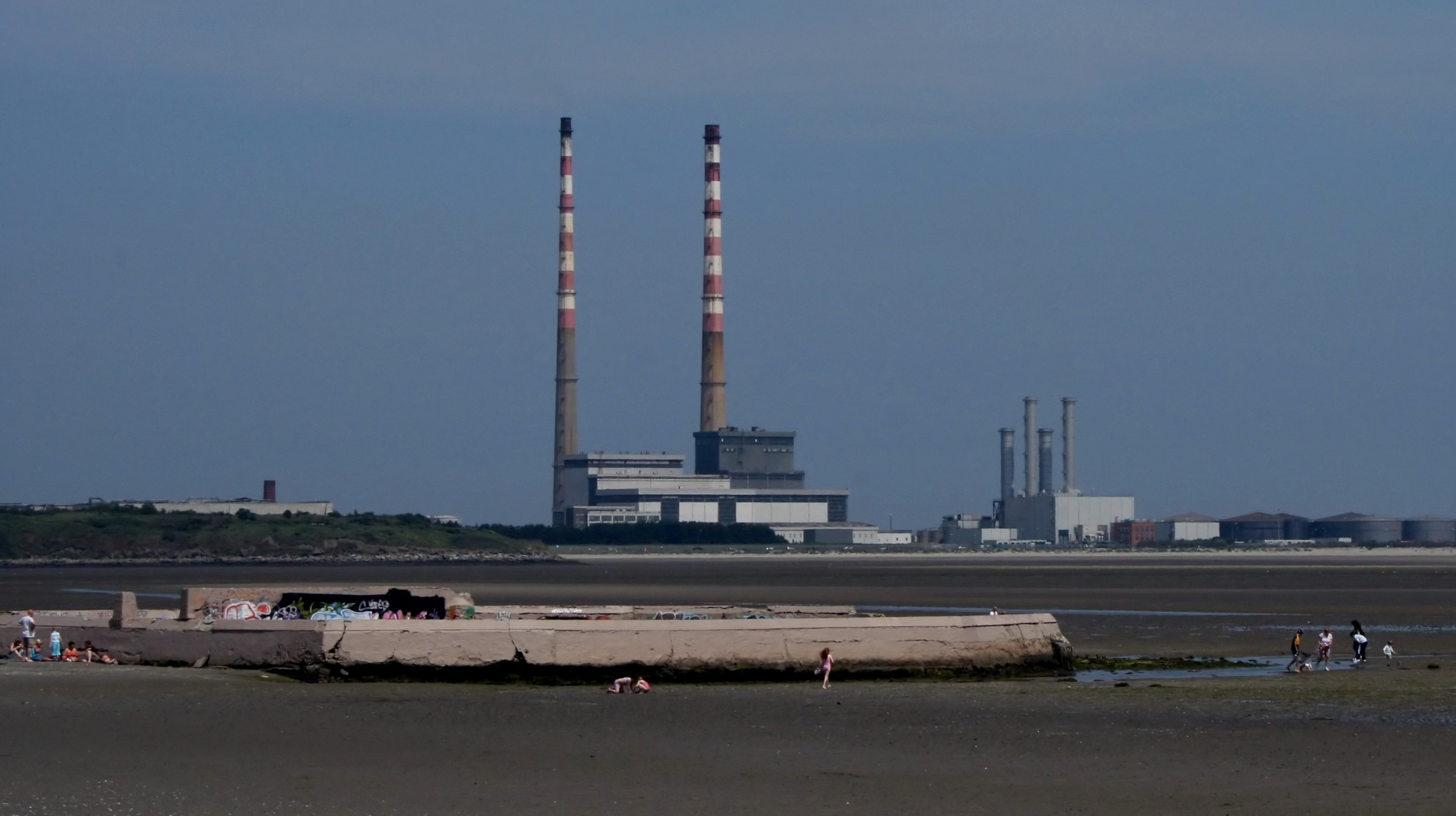
Poolbeg Generating Station Ringsend, Dublin

German Schuko socket outlets were once widely used alongside the British standard BS546 round pin plugs (both 3-pin and 2-pin varieties). However, both of these systems were replaced by BS 1363, standardised as Irish Standard IS 401 (Plug) and IS411 (Socket outlet). This standard eliminated incompatibilities between the Republic of Ireland and Northern Ireland and was chosen as it was completely incompatible with both the old Schuko or BS 546 installations and encouraged people to rewire their homes to comply with the new standard. It removed the possibility of connecting Class I (requiring an earth connection) appliances, to socket outlets that are either unearthed (ungrounded) or with incompatible earthing contacts – e.g. 2-pin side-earthed Schuko plug will not make earth contact with a 3-hole, 5-amp BS 546 socket. Until UK and Irish voltages were standardised at 230 volts in the 1990s, it was common for such plugs to be pre-fitted on appliances destined for the Irish market, although they were prohibited on appliances destined for the United Kingdom market. Both countries now require the pre-fitting of BS 1363 plugs on domestic appliances.

It is now extremely rare to find a non-BS 1363 plug in use.

The 5-amp version of BS 546 is sometimes used for lamps controlled by a central switch or dimmer. They may also be used for other specialist purposes. It is, therefore, not advisable to connect an appliance to such a socket outlet and tourists should not use adaptors to connect to them if they are present in hotel bedrooms. They are exclusively for lighting or specialist purposes.

Industrial, heavy commercial and stage/studio installations use European standard IS EN 60309:1999 / IEC 60309 plugs and sockets. These are also used for stage and studio lighting, in recent preference to BS 546 15-amp fittings.

=== Wiring ===
The distribution board system used in Irish homes also differs substantially from those used in the UK and elsewhere. All distribution boards (fuse boxes) are required to have a 'main fuse' or 'main breaker' rated at the maximum permissible load for that installation. Typically, this is a 63 A fuse (Compared with 80 or 100 amps typically found in the UK) and a switch, or a Minized fuse isolator which accepts a Neozed fuse.

The distribution boards have been using DIN rail modular mounting systems for several decades. Even older fuse systems may be mounted on DIN rails.

30 mA RCD protection is required for all socket outlets since 1981, however it may also be present on older installations.

Homes are typically wired as follows:

- Lighting: 10 amp radials
- Socket outlets: 16 amp or 20 amp radials _{(RCD required)} (32 A ring final circuits are permitted, but are not generally used as frequently as in the UK and are quite rare)
- Fixed appliances: 16 amp or 20 amp radials _{(RCD may be required)}
- Water heater: 20 amp radial _{(RCD required)}
- Cookers : 32–45 amp radial _{(RCD not required, but may be fitted optionally)}
- Hob : 32–45 amp radial _{(RCD not required, but may be fitted optionally)}
- Showers: 32 – 45 amp radial _{(RCD protected)}
- Outdoor sockets : 16 or 20 amp radials _{(RCD required)}

=== Lighting ===
Bayonet mount bulbs are used in most standard fittings and have been the dominant standard in most installations since the introduction of electric lighting in Ireland. Various styles of bayonet cap and mounts are used for a variety of sizes and types of bulbs, including spots and halogens.

Edison screw fittings are not as common, but may be found on some imported lighting equipment, particularly from southern Europe.

Low voltage halogen bulbs use bipin fittings.

Standards are controlled by the ElectroTechnical Council of Ireland (ETCI) and the National Standards Authority of Ireland.

== Employees ==
The ESB is one of the largest companies in Ireland and employs around 7,000 people. It is 5% owned by its workers – this ownership is known as ESB ESOP (Employee Share Ownership Plan) Trustee Limited. The company is heavily unionised with the IWU (Independent Workers Union) being the largest Network Technician union in the company, and the Energy Services Union devoted to representing more senior staff at the organisation. The last major strike was in 1991, though strike action has been threatened as recently as February 2005 and often at times of industrial dispute. National surveys show, in line with other similar semi-state sector workers, that wages are above the national average – one recent survey showed that the average salary costs are twice the national average. It should, however, be remembered that workers of the company may be "on call" after hours, weekends and at holidays because of the unpredictability of emergencies.

== See also ==
- Rolling blackout The "zone rota" system used during labour strikes
- Green eMotion project
- William F. Roe
