= Kilroot =

Townland in County Antrim, Northern Ireland

Kilroot Irish: Cill Ruaidh
- townland

Irish transcription(s)
  - Derivation: Cill Ruaidh
  - Meaning: Church of the redhead
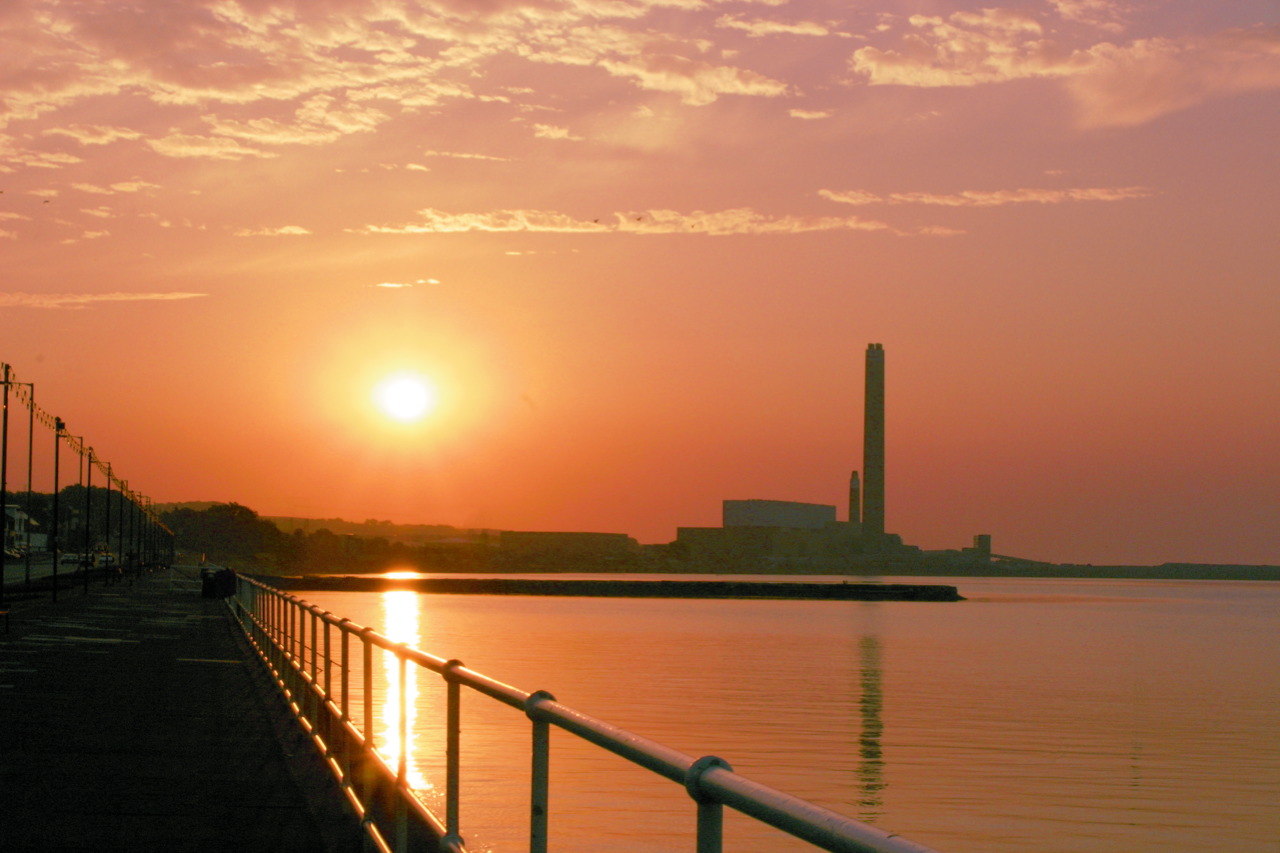
- Looking in the direction of Kilroot from the promenade at Carrickfergus.

- 54°43′55″N 5°45′14″W Kilroot (the United Kingdom)
- Sovereign state: United Kingdom
- Country: Northern Ireland
- County: Antrim
- Barony: Belfast Lower
- Civil parish: Kilroot
- First recorded: Before 1609
- Settlements: Kilroot

Government
  - Council: Mid and East Antrim

Area
  - Total: 647.9 acres (262.21 ha)

Kilroot (from Irish Cill Ruaidh 'church of the redhead') is a townland, population centre and civil parish in County Antrim, Northern Ireland. It lies to the east of Eden, on the outskirts of Carrickfergus on the northern shore of Belfast Lough. It is within the Mid and East Antrim area.

== History ==
According to Archbishop Usher, a church was built in Kilroot in 412 AD.

== Places of interest ==
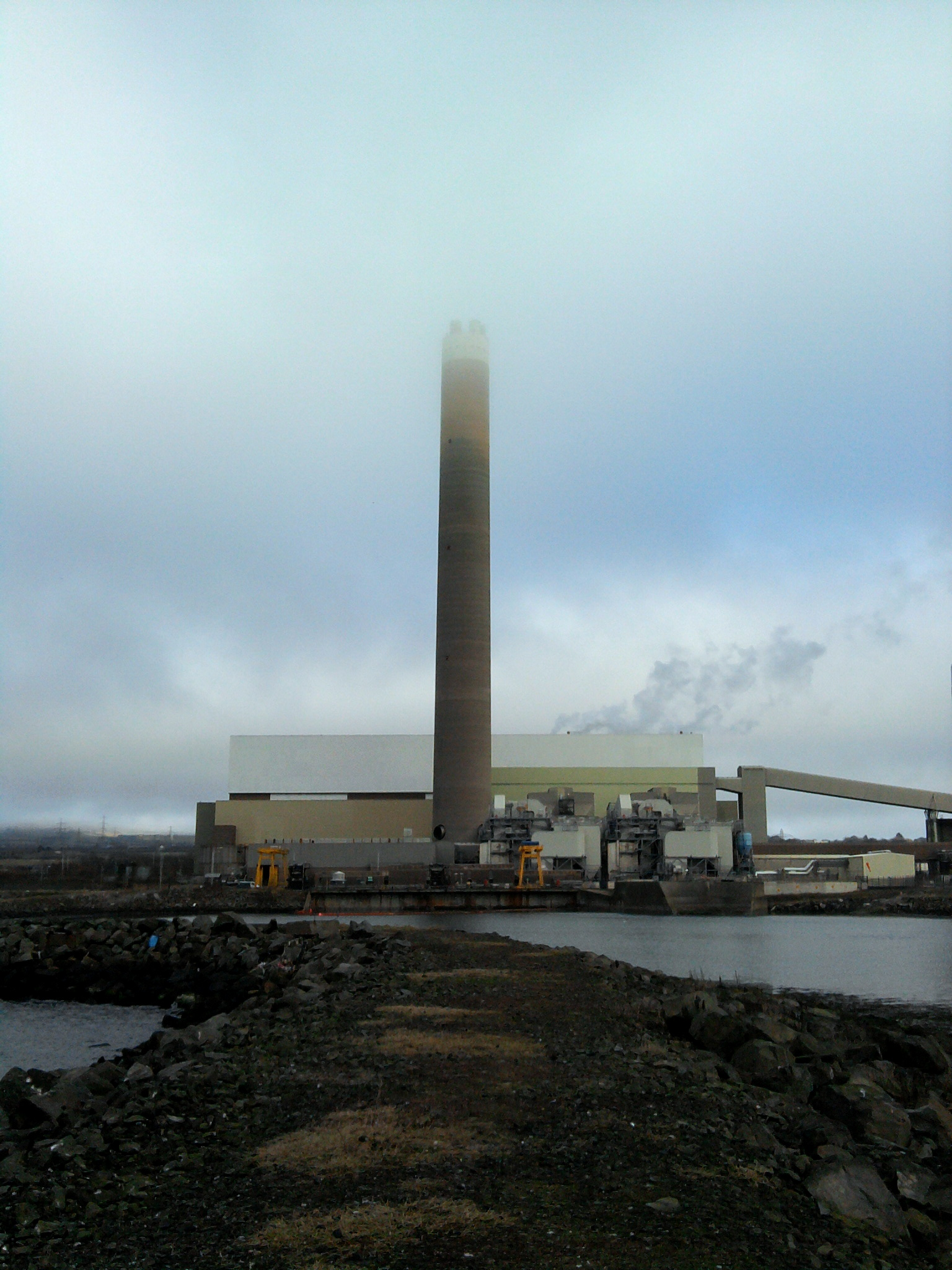
Kilroot power station, as viewed from the end of its only publicly accessible jetty.

The Round House, known locally as Dean Swift's house, is likely to date from the eighteenth century fashion of Romantic cottages. Its diminutive appearance was deceiving as the ground floor contained a parlour 24 feet (7.3 m) by 16 feet (4.9 m). It was a white limewashed thatched cottage unique in its construction without corners. The four straight sections of wall did not join at right angles but were joined by curved sections to form one continuous exterior wall. Swift was reputed by local lore to have said that the devil would never catch him in a corner. The building was demolished in 1959 after a fire, and the site as well as the adjacent Kilroot railway station has disappeared under the new power station.

Kilroot power station is a gas turbine power station. It previously burnt coal and was the last remaining coal-fired power station in Northern Ireland. It once provided about one third of electricity supplies for Northern Ireland.

There is also a network of rock salt (halite) mines in Kilroot which stretch for approximately 30 miles (48 km) underneath Kilroot, Eden and the Carrickfergus East Division. The salt mined here is used to grit Northern Ireland's road surfaces in the winter, as well as being sold to Scotland and England for the same purpose.

Kilroot is home to the 750,000 sq ft (70,000 m^{2}) Kilroot Business Park, located adjacent to the power station.

== People ==
Saint Colmán of Kilroot was a sixth-century Irish disciple of Saint Ailbe of Emly and was bishop of Kilroot, at the same time as being a Benedictine abbot. St. Colman's Church of Ireland parish church, located near Kilroot, is dedicated to Saint Colmán.

Jonathan Swift lived in Kilroot as a prebend for the local church, from March 1695 to May 1696. A ward in St Patrick's University Hospital is named after the village.

== See also ==
- List of civil parishes of County Antrim
