= Kilroot Power Station =

Coal and oil power station in Northern Ireland

Kilroot power station
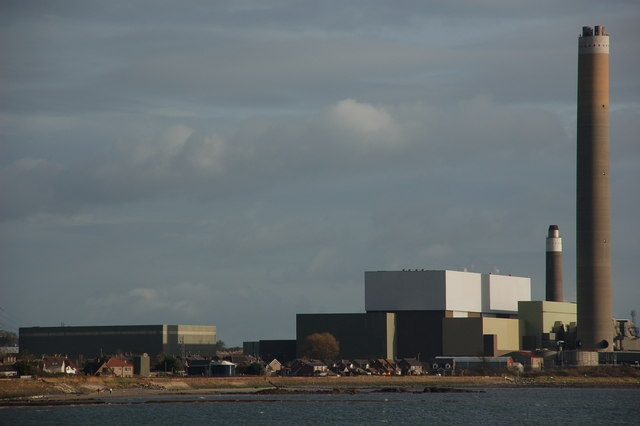
- Kilroot power station in November 2006
- Country: Northern Ireland, UK
- Location: Carrickfergus
- Coordinates: 54.725°N 5.767°W
- Status: Operational
- Construction began: 1974
- Commission date: 1981
- Owner: EP UK Investments
- Operator: EP UK Investments

Thermal power station
- Primary fuel: Natural gas

Power generation
- Nameplate capacity: 141 MW

External links
- Website: https://www.epuki.co.uk/
- Commons: Related media on Commons

Kilroot power station is a fossil fuel power plant on the north shore of Belfast Lough at Kilroot near Carrickfergus in County Antrim, Northern Ireland. The plant currently has a 141 megawatt (MW) capacity from four standby gas turbines and a 10 MW battery energy storage capacity from the Kilroot Advancion Energy Storage Array.

When coal power generation stopped in September 2023, it was the second last coal-fired power station operating in Northern Ireland, (the one at the dupont site in Maydown Londonderry being the last, in whole of UK),and it had a 560 megawatt (MW) capacity from dual coal and oil fuelled generators. The station once produced a third of the country's electricity, and was also one of County Antrim's top 100 employers in 2010 (or before).

In 1992, the station was purchased by AES Corporation, as part of the privatisation of the state-owned Northern Ireland Electricity. In 2019 it was sold to a subsidiary of Energetický a průmyslový holding.

== History ==
Kilroot power station was designed and built by Kennedy and Donkin, consultants for Northern Ireland Electricity (NIE), commencing in 1974. The Cleveland Bridge Company also worked on the construction of the station. The station was originally designed to use four 300 megawatt (MW) generating units. Due to government spending restrictions in the early 1980s the project was truncated to two units. The station opened on 1 February 1981, when the first of the two generating unit went into operation. The plant was completed in 1982. The power station was originally fuelled by only oil, as it was the lowest cost fuel at the time. But following a change in generating policies in Northern Ireland in 1985 following the increase in oil prices, it was decided the plant would be converted to burn coal as well as oil. This conversion took place between 1986 and 1989, and the power station has burned almost exclusively only coal ever since.

The AES Corporation took over the station in a 50/50 partnership with Tractebel of Belgium in 1992 when NIE was privatised and sold its four power stations in Northern Ireland. Tractebel later sold their holding so that today Kilroot is solely run by AES.

In December 2005, AES was granted permission to install flue gas desulfurization (FGD) equipment at the station. This was to help the station meet the EU Large Combustion Plant Directive by January 2008.

Kilroot Power Limited opted into the Transitional National Plan of the Industrial Emissions Directive from 1 January 2016 to 30 June 2020. The Transitional National Plan allows the plant to pollute at a higher rate that would otherwise be permitted by EU rules as long as overall emissions for all participating plants are reduced each year.

In January 2018, Kilroot's failure to win a new contract under the Single Electricity Market threatened its closure by May. However, the plant owner AES had to apply to the Utility Regulator for a derogation to allow it to shut the plant, which has not been granted. Ballylumford was also affected, with the B station likely to close with the potential loss of 30 jobs.

In April 2019 AES Corporation has agreed to sell Kilroot to EP UK Investments, a subsidiary of Energetický a průmyslový holding. The transaction was finalized in June 2019.

== Specification ==
The original main boilers were designed and built by Clarke Chapman. The station's turbo generators was designed and built by GEC. Each of the station's two units could dual-fire coal and oil, and had the capacity to produce 280 MW of electricity when burning oil.

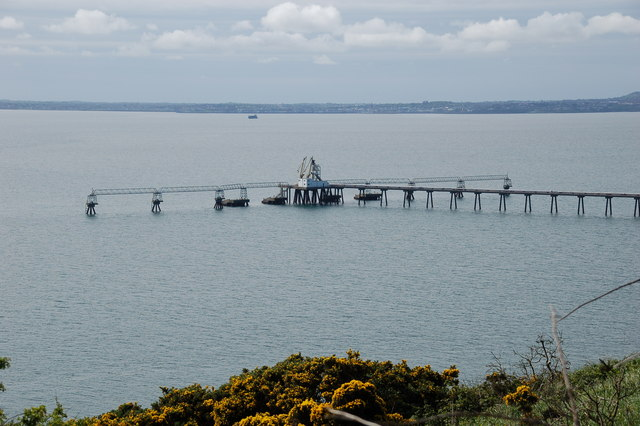
The end of the jetty at Cloghan Point, overlooking Belfast Lough

Coal was delivered to the jetty at Kilroot by small colliers typically capable of carrying 8,000 tonnes of coal. This was transferred by the collier's unloader onto Kilroot's conveyor, which transported the coal to the junction tower. From the junction tower the coal could be transported to the bunkers for immediate use or stored for later use. The Central Stacker Reclaimer (CSR) distributed the stored coal around itself ready to be reclaimed when the coal was required.

The coal in the bunker was transported to the mills via further conveyors, where the coal was pulverised into a gritty powder. The coal was then mixed with hot air as it was conveyed to the boiler for combustion, coal entered the boiler at several heights in the boiler and at the 4 corners. These coal feeders were positioned in order to maximise the efficient burning of the fuel. The coal was heated before entering the boiler to reduce the moisture content of the coal and increase efficiency.

The electricity was generated at 17 kilovolts (kV) and raised via transformers to 275 kV for transmission on the Northern Ireland electricity distribution grid.

Oil was imported at the jetty at Kilroot since a modification in 2009 and stored in 2 large storage tanks located adjacent to the main Carrickfergus Larne Road.

== Conversion to gas power ==
In May 2020, the plant won a power auction to supply electricity from gas power from 2023/2024. The coal plant closed in September 2023, with commercial operation of the new gas turbines not expected until Q1 2024.

Two Siemens Energy open-cycle gas turbine generators are currently being installed, each rated at 350 MW. The two generators are being accommodated within the existing turbine hall and boiler house buildings. They occupy the space previously allocated for the originally planned third and fourth oil-fired generators, which were ultimately never installed.

It is likely that further new capacity will be installed, either through an additional open-cycle gas turbine, or through the installation of a steam turbine generator; this second option would reconfigure the new station to combined-cycle, by using exhaust gases from the two new gas turbines to generate heat and hence steam for the new steam set.

Gas for the new turbines will be supplied from a connection into Mutual Energy's Belfast Gas Transmission Pipeline.

The plant began producing electricity from gas in late March 2024.
