= Green eMotion project =

European Union project promoting electromobility

Green eMotion was a four-year EU project to promote electromobility in Europe, which was officially launched in Brussels on 31 March 2011.

Commission provided a total of €24 million in funding to support the project. Siim Kallas, aimed to link the currently ongoing regional and national electromobility initiatives, where they applied their results, and compared the different technology approaches, to support the best possible solutions for the European market. The platform allowed for co-operation among the various players and promote both new, high-quality transportation services and convenient payment systems for the users of electric vehicles. Overall, the commission paved the way for the creation of a mass market for electric vehicles in the EU. In selected demonstration regions, 43 project partners, including industrial enterprises and automotive companies, power utilities, municipal governments and universities, as well as testing and research institutions, studied the conditions to get information on the main goal. Green eMotion was part of the Transport 2050 Roadmap, an EU strategy paper that strives to bring about a 60% reduction in CO_{2} emissions from road transportation by the year 2050.

== The project ==
As part of the Green eMotion project, the project partners conducted research to determine the conditions to fulfilled and ensure the smooth, cross-border use of electric vehicles. The initiative particularly focused on developing uniform, Europe-wide processes, standards and IT solutions: which attempted to make it possible for users of electric vehicles to have easy access to charging infrastructures and related services throughout Europe. Aside from issues such as connection technology and compatibility with different charging stations, the initiative also focused on solving economic questions, such as the problem-free billing of charging services with different power utilities or grid operators within the participating countries, also on a cross-border basis.

The ten demonstration regions defined in the project had more than 2,500 charging stations in practical operation at the end of 2011, so as to allow for representative data collection. Green eMotion will combine the experiences collected in the previous local approaches of individual demonstration regions within a comprehensive European model test to evaluate the basic conditions for cross-border electro-mobility. In addition to researching the options for using electric passenger vehicles, Green eMotion will also study the use of bi-wheeled vehicles and busses, including both purely electric models and hybrid models.

== The Green eMotion demonstration regions ==
The demonstration regions of the Green eMotion project will study various aspects of electromobility in Europe, including studies of user behaviour, for example, and will develop proposals for guidelines and decision-making bases for political office holders. Consideration will also be given to organisational and technical details, including different vehicle types (purely electric passenger vehicles, busses and bi-wheeled vehicles, but also hybrid vehicles). The demonstration regions will also serve the purpose of practically testing a wide range of electromobility aspects, including battery exchange, charging with direct-current electricity and the integration with smart grids.

The Green eMotion cx regions:

=== Copenhagen/Bornholm /Malmö ===
Research focal points: Battery exchange, cross-border transportation, up to 4,500 charging stations and up to 3,500 vehicles, and research to improve battery life

=== Strasbourg ===
Research focal points: Plug-in hybrid vehicles, 100 charging stations, cross-border links with Karlsruhe/Stuttgart.

=== Karlsruhe/Stuttgart ===
Research focal points: Smart grid characteristics, optimised bi-directional charging; cross-border link with Strasbourg.

=== Berlin ===
Research focal points: World's largest integrated e-mobility project devoted to researching business models and customer behaviour, 3,600 charging stations.

=== Ireland (Dublin, Cork) ===
Research focal points: Direct-current charging stations, billing with free choice of electricity vendor, approximately 2,000 vehicles and 3,500 charging stations

=== Madrid/Ataun ===
Research focal points: Smart grid integration and integration of renewable energy sources for generating electricity (integration of renewable energy sources, RES)

=== Barcelona/Malaga ===
Research focal points: Citizen service centre for electromobility, e-bikes.

Particular aspects: integration with a smart city concept, building-to-grid (B2G, meaning that buildings integrated with smart grids and supported by building control systems and information technology will use previously unutilised degrees of freedom (shiftable loads, load shedding, partial load operation, etc.) to optimise grid operation)., Vehicle to Grid (V2G), direct-current charging stations.

== See also ==
- EURELECTRIC (EURELECTRIC – the European association representing the electricity industry)
- Siemens
