= Energy in Ireland =

Energy mix of Ireland

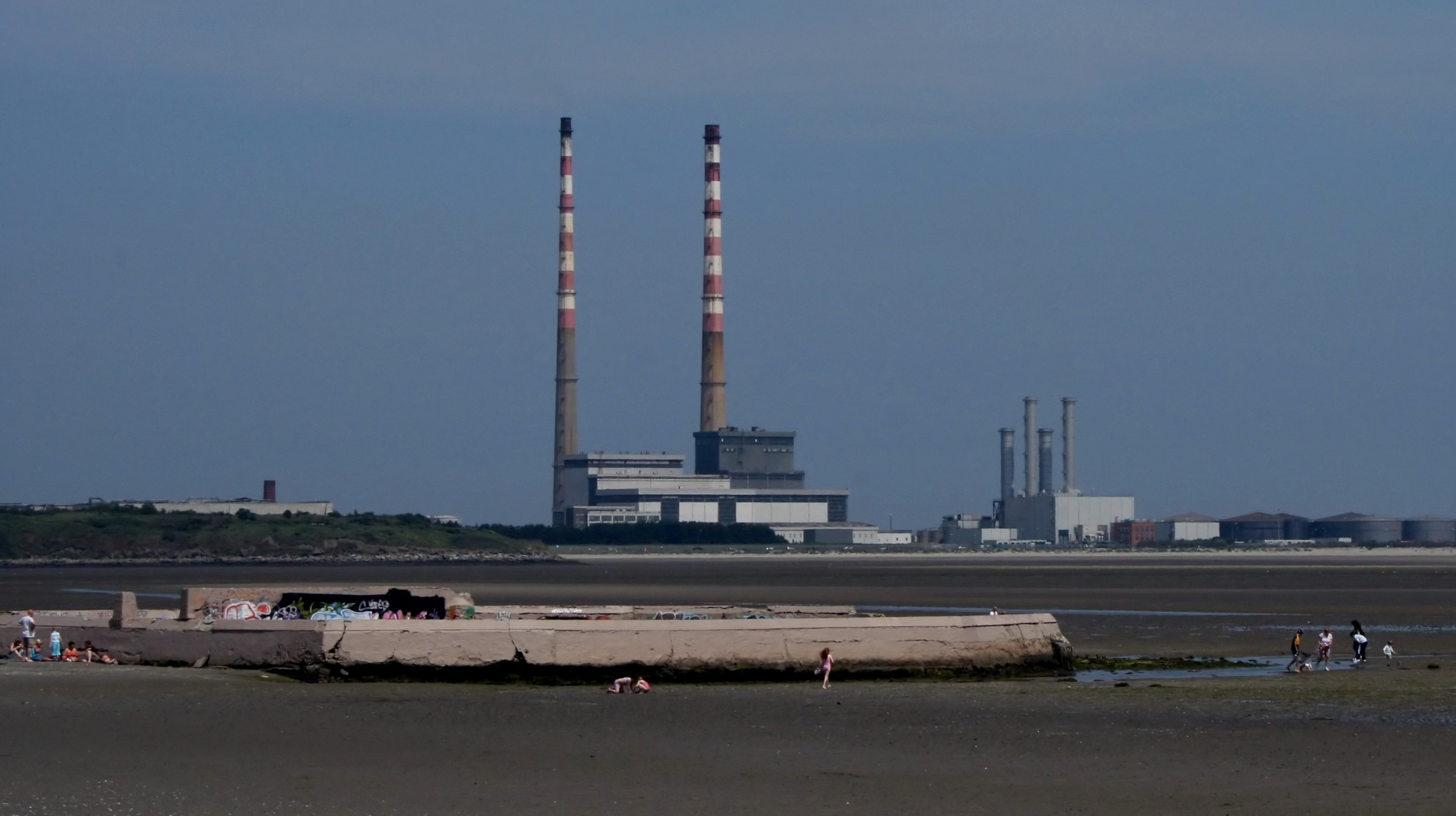
Poolbeg Generating Station, a fossil gas power station owned by the semi-state electricity company, the ESB Group.

Ireland is a net energy importer and remains highly dependent on fossil fuels. According to the Sustainable Energy Authority of Ireland's 2024 report, fossil fuels supplied 82.7% of Ireland's energy needs in 2023, while renewable energy accounted for 14.1% of primary energy, its highest share to date. End-user energy demand was 140.8 TWh in 2023, with oil products accounting for 55.6% of all energy consumed and transport the largest consuming sector at 43.4%. Energy-related emissions fell by 8.3% in 2023 to 31.4 MtCO2eq, their lowest level in over 30 years.

Final consumption of electricity in 2023 was 31.6 TWh, an increase of 1.24 TWh on the previous year. Renewable electricity generation, consisting of wind, hydro, landfill gas, biomass and biogas, accounted for 30.1% of gross electricity consumption in 2017 and had risen to 40.1% by 2024. In 2019, it was 31 TWh with renewables accounting for 37.6% of consumption.

Energy-related CO_{2} emissions decreased by 2.1% in 2017 to a level 17% above 1990 levels. Energy-related CO_{2} emissions were 18% below 2005 levels. 60% of Irish greenhouse gas emissions are caused by energy consumption.

== Statistics ==
2020 energy statistics

Production capacities for electricity (billion kWh)
Type	Amount
Fossil fuel	57.87
Wind power	34.84
Hydro	3.70
Biomass	3.60
Solar	0.20
Total	100.21

Electricity (billion kWh)
Category	Amount
Consumption	30.63
Production	33.09
Import	1.76
Export	1.91

Natural Gas (billion m^{3})
Consumption	5.49
Production	2.65
Import	2.85

Crude Oil (barrels per day)
Consumption	58,070,000
Production	219,000
Import	22,010,000

CO_{2} emissions:
33.74 million tons

== Energy plan ==
Ireland's Climate Action Plan 2024 sets out actions intended to halve national emissions by 2030 and reach net zero no later than 2050. The plan is aligned with legally binding economy-wide carbon budgets and sectoral emissions ceilings agreed by the Government of Ireland.

== Primary energy sources ==
=== Fossil fuels ===
==== Natural gas ====
There have been four commercial natural gas discoveries since exploration began offshore Ireland in the early 1970s; namely the Kinsale Head, Ballycotton and Seven Heads producing gas fields off the coast of Cork and the Corrib gas field off the coast of Mayo.

The only remaining productive natural gas/Fossil gas field in Ireland is the Corrib gas project. The Kinsale Head gas field is now depleted and was decommissioned in 2023. Since the Corrib gas field came on stream in 2016, Ireland reduced its energy import dependency from 88% in 2015 to 69% in 2016.

The Corrib Gas Field was discovered off the west coast of Ireland in 1996. Approximately 70% of the size of the Kinsale Head field, it has an estimated producing life of just over 15 years. Production began in 2015. The project was operated by Royal Dutch Shell until 2018, and from 2018 onwards by Vermilion Energy.

Indigenous production of gas in thousand tonnes of oil equivalent from 1990 to 2019

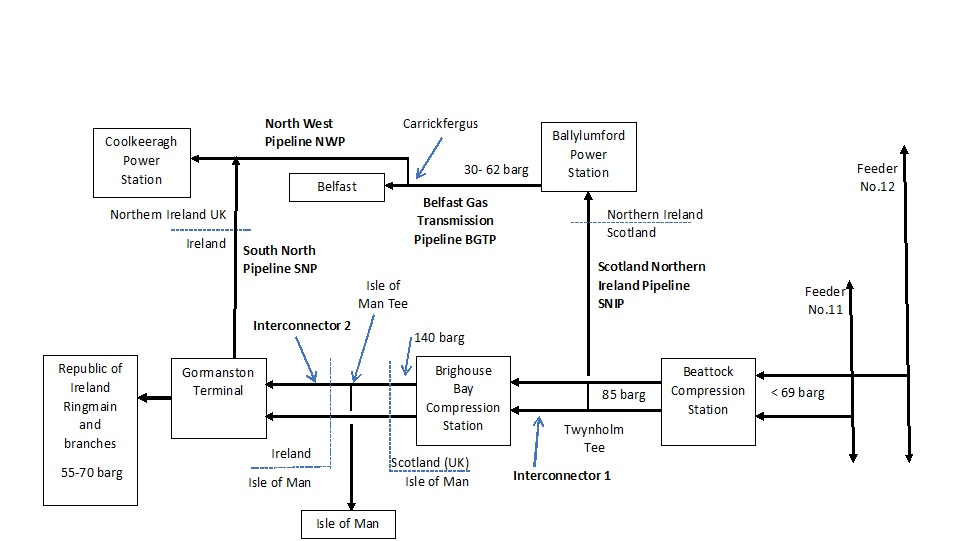
Gas interconnectors 1

Since 1991 Ireland has imported natural gas by pipeline from the British National Transmission System in Scotland. This was from the Interconnector IC1 commissioned in 1991 and Interconnector IC2 commissioned in 2003.

Import of gas in thousand tonnes of oil equivalent from 1990 to 2019

==== Peat ====
Ireland uses peat, a fuel composed of decayed plants and other organic matter which is usually found in swampy lowlands known as bogs, as energy which is not common in Europe. Peat in Ireland was historically used for two main purposes – to generate electricity and as a fuel for domestic heating. The raised bogs in Ireland are located mainly in the midlands.

Bord na Móna is a commercial semi-state company that was established under the Turf Development Act 1946. The company was responsible for the mechanised harvesting of peat in Ireland. The National Parks and Wildlife Service (NPWS), under the remit of the Minister for Housing, Local Government and Heritage, deals with Special Areas of Conservation and Special Protection Areas under the Habitats Directive. Restrictions have been imposed on the harvesting of peat in certain areas under relevant designations.

The West Offaly Power Station was refused permission to continue burning peat for electricity and closed in December 2020.

Edenderry was the last power station to fired by peat in Ireland. Bord na Móna had been co-firing peat with biomass at Edenderry for more than 5 years but from 2023 it has been fired solely with biomass.

==== Coal ====
Coal remains an important solid fuel that is still used in home heating by a certain portion of households. In order to improve air quality, certain areas are banned from burning so-called 'smoky coal.' The regulations and policy relating to smoky fuel are dealt with by the Minister for the Environment, Climate and Communications.

Coal-fired electricity generation in Ireland ended in June 2025, when ESB ceased burning coal at Moneypoint power station six months earlier than planned. The station remains available to EirGrid as an out-of-market generator of last resort, using heavy fuel oil instead of coal, until 2029.

==== Oil ====
There have been no commercial discoveries of oil in Ireland to date.

One Irish oil explorer is Providence Resources, with CEO Tony O'Reilly, Junior and among the main owners Tony O'Reilly with a 40% stake.

The oil industry in Ireland is based on the import, production and distribution of refined petroleum products. Oil and petroleum products are imported via oil terminals around the coast. Some crude oil is imported for processing at Ireland's only oil refinery at Whitegate Cork.

=== Renewable Energy ===
In 2023, Ireland's overall renewable energy share was 15.3%, up from 13.1% in 2022 but still below its 2020 baseline target of 16%. Renewable energy accounted for 14.1% of primary energy, the highest share recorded to date..

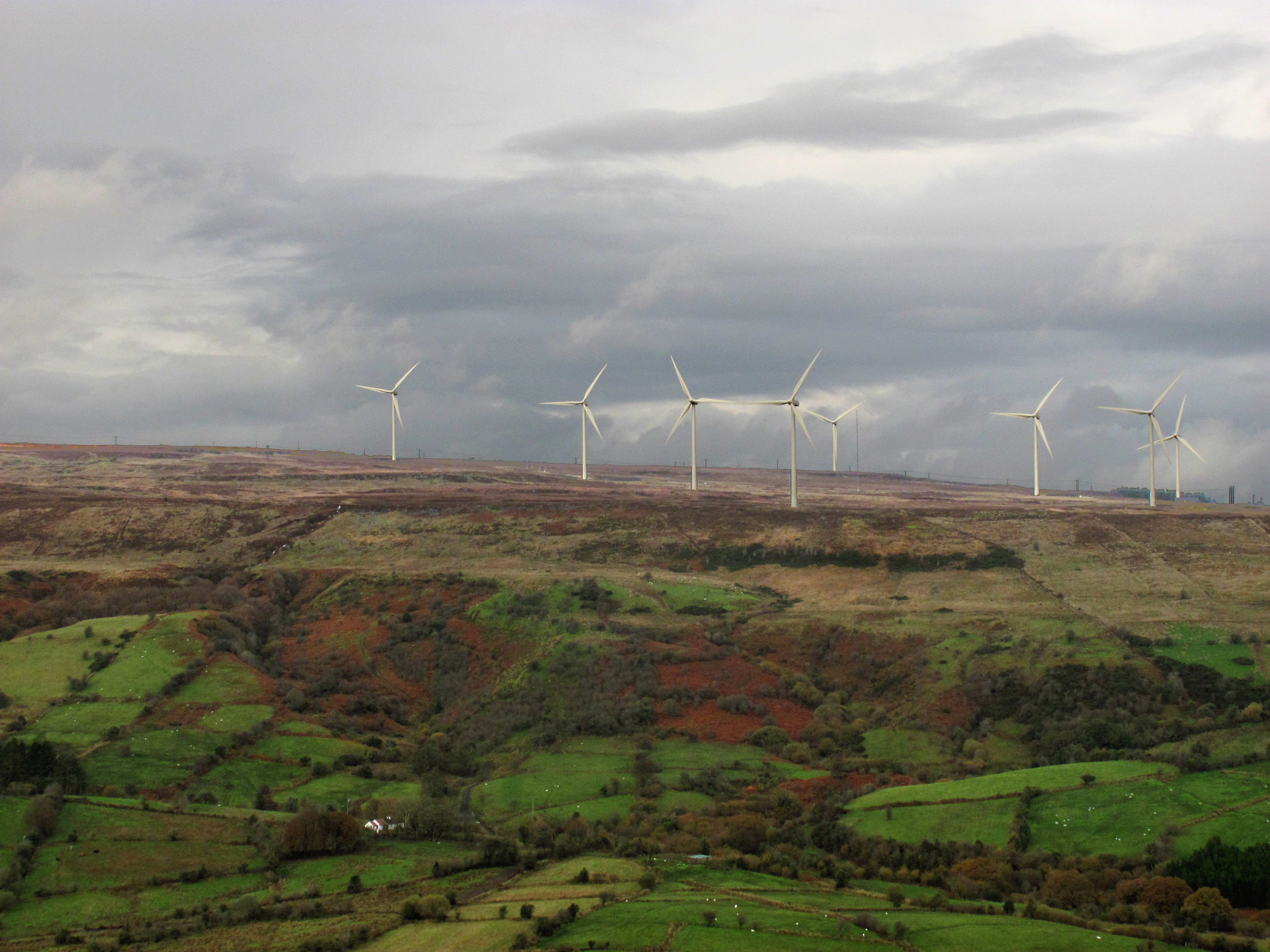
Wind turbines on County Leitrim's Corrie Mountain

Ireland renewable electricity production by source

Under the original 2009 Renewable Energy Directive Ireland had set a target of producing 16% of all its energy needs from renewable energy sources by 2020 but that has been updated by a second Renewable Energy Directive whose targets are 32% by 2030. Between 2005 and 2014 the percentage of energy from renewable energy sources grew from just 3.1% to 8.6% of total final consumption. By 2020 the overall renewable energy share was 13.5%, short of its Renewable Energy Directive target of 16%. In 2023, Ireland's overall renewable energy share was 15.3%, up from 13.1% in 2022 but still below the 2020 target of 16%. Renewable energy accounted for 14.1% of primary energy, its highest share recorded to date.

The country has a large and growing installed wind power capacity at 4,405 MW by the end of 2021 producing 31% of all its electricity needs in that year. By February 2024, there was 1 GW of solar PV capacity connected to the electricity grid. By April 2024, Ireland had 1 GW of grid-connected energy storage capacity, almost 750 MW of which was battery storage, with the remainder supplied by Turlough Hill Power Station.

==== Biomass power ====
Non-renewable energy refers to energy generated from domestic and commercial waste in Energy-from-Waste plants. The Dublin Waste-to-Energy Facility burns waste to provide heat to generate electricity and provide district heating for areas of Dublin.

Contribution of non-renewable energy in thousand tonnes of oil equivalent to Ireland's energy supply

==== Solar power ====
Photovoltaic (PV) modules on domestic roofs are becoming more common, following the removal of VAT and an increase in grants, with 60,000 homes fitted by summer 2023, increasing at 500 per week, with a 2023 capacity of 700MW that is generating 600,000Mwh. A University College Cork satellite survey identified 1 million homes with a suitable orientation to suit 10 roof panels.

==== Wind power ====
Locations of wind farms on and around the island of Ireland

As of 2021, the island of Ireland had 5,585 MW of installed wind power capacity, with 4,309 MW in the Republic of Ireland. In 2020, wind provided over 86% of Ireland's renewable electricity and generated 36.3% of Ireland's electricity demand, one of the highest percentages globally. In 2023, Wind Energy Ireland confirmed that wind farms provided 35 per cent of Ireland and Northern Ireland's electricity in 2023, totalling a record breaking 13,725 gigawatt-hours (GWh). Ireland has over 300 wind farms, mostly onshore. A Public Service Obligation subsidy supports renewable energy and wind power development, driven by concerns over energy, security, and climate change mitigation.

=== Wood ===
The Department of Agriculture, Food and the Marine have responsibility for the Forest Service and forestry policy in Ireland. Coillte (a commercial state company operating in forestry, land based businesses, renewable energy and panel products) and Coford (the Council for Forest Research and Development) also fall under that Department's remit.

Wood is used by households that rely on solid fuels for home heating. It is used in open fireplaces, stoves and biomass boilers.

In 2014, the Department produced a draft bioenergy strategy. In compiling the strategy, the Department worked closely with the Department of Agriculture in terms of the potential of sustainable wood biomass for energy purposes.

== Electricity ==
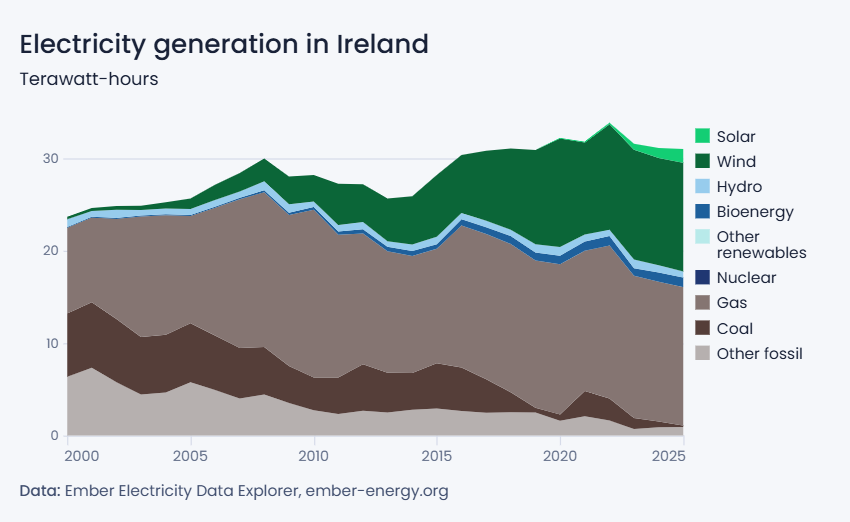
Electricity generation in Ireland in terawatt-hours

In 2025, electricity demand in Ireland was 34.1 TWh, up 3.7% from 2024. Gas accounted for 40% of gross electricity supply, wind for 32.1%, and net imports for 16.3%. Commercial services accounted for 42.1% of electricity demand, while data centers accounted for 22.5%. Data centers were responsible for 78% of the net increase in electricity demand between 2015 and 2025.

Ireland is connected to the adjacent UK National Grid at an electricity interconnection level of 9% (transmission capacity relative to production capacity). The Celtic Interconnector, a 700 MW link between Ireland and France, is under construction and is expected to be commissioned in Q4 2028. EirGrid says the project will be the first electricity interconnector between Ireland and continental Europe and will strengthen electricity security of supply.

== Energy storage ==
The utility ESB operates a pumped storage station in Co. Wicklow called Turlough Hill with 292 MW peak power capacity. A Compressed air energy storage project in salt caverns near Larne received €15m of funding from EU. It won a further €90m from the EU in 2017 as a project of common interest (PCI). It was intended to provide a 250-330 MW buffer for 6–8 hours in the electricity system. This project has since been cancelled due to the company in charge of the project, Gaelectric, entering administration in 2017.

Statkraft completed a 11MW, 5.6MWh lithium-ion battery energy storage system in April 2020. ESB has developed a battery facility on the site of its Aghada gas-fired power station in Co. Cork.

Several other battery energy storage systems are in development. ESB and partner company Fluence are developing a further 60 MWh of battery capacity at Inchicore in Dublin, a 150 MWh / 75 MW plant in Poolbeg, Dublin, and a 38 MWh plant at Aghada. These facilities are primarily aimed at providing ancillary grid services. In March 2026, FuturEnergy Ireland and Form Energy announced an agreement for a planned 10 MW / 1,000 MWh iron-air battery energy storage project in County Donegal, with operations expected to begin in 2029.

The depleted Kinsale gas field was used as a natural gas storage facility until its closure in 2017. Since then, there has been no dedicated large-scale natural gas storage capacity in the country. A government-commissioned report on security of energy supply recommended the development of a strategic gas storage facility or the use of a Floating Storage and Regasification Unit.

Imported crude oil and petroleum products are stored at oil terminals around the coast. A strategic reserve of petroleum products, equivalent to 90 days usage, is stored at some of these terminals. The National Oil Reserves Agency is responsible for the strategic reserve. Moneypoint formerly stored coal for electricity generation, but after coal generation ended in 2025 ESB installed heavy fuel oil storage for its temporary role as an out-of-market generator of last resort until 2029.

== Carbon Tax ==
In 2010 the country's carbon tax was introduced at €15 per tonne of CO_{2} emissions (approx. US$20 per tonne).

From 1 May 2025, the natural gas carbon tax rate was €11.48 per MWh at gross calorific value, based on a carbon charge of €63.50 per tonne of CO2 emitted.

The tax applies to kerosene, marked gas oil, liquid petroleum gas, fuel oil, and natural gas. The tax does not apply to electricity because the cost of electricity is already included in pricing under the Single Electricity Market (SEM). Similarly, natural gas users are exempt if they can prove they are using the gas to "generate electricity, for chemical reduction, or for electrolytic or metallurgical processes". Partial relief is granted for natural gas covered by a greenhouse gas emissions permit issued by the Environmental Protection Agency. Such gas will be taxed at the minimum rate specified in the EU Energy Tax Directive, which is €0.54 per megawatt-hour at gross calorific value." Pure biofuels are also exempt. The Economic and Social Research Institute (ESRI) estimated costs between €2 and €3 a week per household: a survey from the Central Statistics Office reports that Ireland's average disposable income was almost €48,000 in 2007.

Activist group Active Retirement Ireland proposed a pensioner's allowance of €4 per week for the 30 weeks currently covered by the fuel allowance and that home heating oil be covered under the Household Benefit Package.

The tax is paid by companies. Payment for the first accounting period was due in July 2010. Fraudulent violation is punishable by jail or a fine.

The NGO Irish Rural Link noted that according to ESRI a carbon tax would weigh more heavily on rural households. They claim that other countries have shown that carbon taxation succeeds only if it is part of a comprehensive package that includes reducing other taxes.

In 2011, the coalition government of Fine Gael and Labour raised the tax to €20/tonne. Farmers were granted tax relief.

The Minister for Finance introduced, with effect from 1 May 2013, a solid fuel carbon tax (SFCT). The Revenue Commissioners have responsibility for administering the tax. It applies to coal and peat and is chargeable per tonne of product.

== Sustainable Energy Authority of Ireland (SEAI) ==
The Sustainable Energy Authority of Ireland (SEAI) was established as Ireland's national energy authority under the Sustainable Energy Act 2002. SEAI's mission is to play a leading role in transforming Ireland into a society based on sustainable energy structures, technologies and practices. To fulfil this mission SEAI aims to advise the Government, and deliver a range of programmes aimed at a wide range of stakeholders.

== Nuclear energy ==
The Single Electricity Market encompassing the entire island of Ireland does not, and has never, produced any electricity from nuclear power stations. The production of electricity for the Irish national grid (Eirgrid), by nuclear fission, is prohibited in the Republic of Ireland by the Electricity Regulation Act, 1999 (Section 18). The enforcement of this law is only possible within the borders of Ireland, and it does not prohibit consumption. Since 2001 in Northern Ireland and 2012 in the Republic, the grid has become increasingly interconnected with the neighbouring electric grid of Britain, and therefore Ireland is now partly powered by overseas nuclear fission stations.

Ireland did, however, host a small student training reactor at University College Cork; the dismantled reactor's uranium remained in secure storage on campus in the 2000s, and in 2003 The Irish Times reported that it had generated no power and was not a commercial reactor.

A ‘Eurobarometer’ survey in 2007 indicated that 27 percent of the citizens of Ireland were in favour of an “increased use” of nuclear energy. More recent polling suggested a more divided picture. In 2021, an Ireland Thinks poll for The Good Information Project found respondents evenly split on whether Ireland should build a nuclear power station, with 43% in favour and 43% opposed. In 2026, The Irish Times reported that a Red C survey for KPMG found that one in three Irish adults backed the construction of nuclear power plants in Ireland, while opposition remained higher at about 45%.

Debate over nuclear power in Ireland revived in the 2020s, with the Workers' Party adopting a pro-nuclear policy in 2023 and both former Green Party leader Eamon Ryan and Taoiseach Micheál Martin expressing greater openness to nuclear power in 2026.

== See also ==
- Electricity sector in Ireland
- Renewable energy in the Republic of Ireland
- List of power stations in the Republic of Ireland
- Oil terminals in Ireland
- Whitegate refinery
- Renewable energy by country
- United Kingdom–Ireland natural gas interconnectors
