= Whitegate =

Whitegate may refer to:

== England ==
- Whitegate, Cheshire, England, a village near Northwich
  - Whitegate railway station, serving the Cheshire village
- Whitegate, Greater Manchester, England, a district of Oldham

== Ireland ==
- Whitegate, County Clare, a village
- Whitegate, County Cork, a village
- Whitegate power station, County Cork, a generating station in Cork Harbour
- Whitegate refinery, County Cork, an oil refinery in Cork Harbour

== See also ==
- Whitegates, Isle of Man
