= Whitegate, Ireland =

Whitegate, Ireland may refer to:

- Whitegate, County Clare, a village
- Whitegate, County Cork, village
- Whitegate power station, County Cork, a generating station in Cork Harbour
- Whitegate refinery, County Cork, an oil refinery in Cork Harbour
