= Carraig á Mhaistin stone =

- Carraig á Mhaistin (Irish)
- Rostellan dolmen, Rostellan Cromlech, Rostellan Portal Tomb
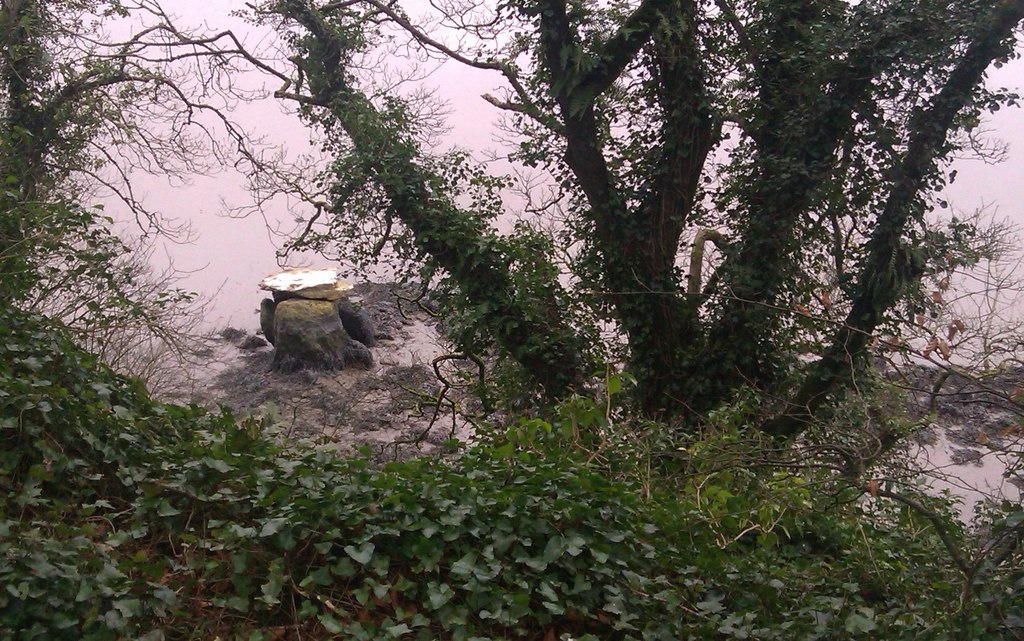
- Interactive map of Carraig á Mhaistin stone
- 51.857127°N 8.18263°W
- Type: megalithic tomb
- Periods: Early Neolithic
- Location: Saleen Creek, Cork harbour
- OS grid reference: W 87412 67240

Site notes
- Material: stone
- Elevation: 1 m (3 ft 3 in)
- Height: 1.79 m (5 ft 10 in)
- Length: 25 m (82 ft)
- Width: 4.5 m (15 ft)
- Discovered: c. 1860
- Condition: inter-tidal
- Public access: yes, low tide only

The Carraig á Mhaistin stone (transl. Bully Rock) is a megalithic tomb located in Cork harbour. It was previously believed to have been an 18th-century folly, built by Murrough O'Brien, 1st Marquess of Thomond, like the nearby Siddons Tower folly.

== History ==
The monument was first reported by antiquarian John Windele after an 1860 visit to the area. A man named Dr. Wise had the capstone raised from where it had fallen.

== Condition ==
The tomb is nearly submerged at the high tide mark, as is the accompanying cairn. The tomb is made of three upright stones largely covered in seaweed and a capstone. It faces east.
