= Whitegate power station =

Generating station in Cork Harbour, Ireland

- Country: Ireland
- Location: Whitegate, County Cork
- Coordinates: 51°49′07″N 08°15′17″W
- Status: Operational
- Construction began: March 2008
- Commission date: June 2010
- Construction cost: €400 million
- Owner: Bord Gáis Energy
- Operator: Bord Gáis Energy
- Employees: 50

Thermal power station
- Primary fuel: Natural gas
- Secondary fuel: Light distillate
- Tertiary fuel: Refinery off gas
- Turbine technology: CCGT
- Site area: 11 hectare
- Site elevation: Sea level
- Chimneys: 1 (60 metres)
- Cooling source: Air cooling (fin-fan)
- Combined cycle?: Yes

Power generation
- Units operational: 2 x 280 MW
- Make and model: General Electric GE Frame 9FB
- Nameplate capacity: 445 MW
- Annual net output: 50 GWh (2011)

Whitegate power station is a 445 MW combined cycle gas turbine (CCGT) electricity generating station near Whitegate, County Cork in Ireland. It was commissioned in 2010 and can supply up to ten percent of the electricity demand in Ireland.

== History ==
In 2005 the then ESB Eirgrid identified that additional electricity generating capacity would be required by 2010. In response Bord Gáis Éireann (now Bord Gáis Energy), a commercial state body, proposed to build a new power station in County Cork. A site was selected (51°49′07″N 08°15′17″W) adjacent to Whitegate refinery, this provided ready access to light distillate from the refinery for use as fuel. It was also close to the natural gas grid and to the electricity grid at the 110 kV high voltage Whitegate substation. Bord Gáis contracted General Electric Operations and Maintenance (GE O&M) to design, operate and maintain the power station. Construction started in March 2008. The investment in the station was €400 million.

== Whitegate power station ==
Whitegate power station is a 445 MW combined cycle gas turbine (CCGT) station. The station comprises two 280 MW General Electric GE Frame 9FB gas turbines. The gas turbines can be fired with natural gas or light distillate fuel. The turbines drive alternators. The turbine exhaust generates steam in the heat recovery steam generator (HRSG), the steam is used to drive a 150 MW GE A15 steam turbine and an alternator. Steam is condensed in an air cooler (fin-fan cooler). Additional firing is available in the inlet duct of the HRSG, using refinery off gas or natural gas The thermal efficiency of the station is 58.5%, making it the most efficient station in Ireland. The station was commissioned on 8 November 2009.

Electricity output from the station is transformed up to 220 kV. This is fed into the 220 kV line between Aghada power station and Raffeen substation.

== Operations ==
It was envisaged that the station would principally run on light distillate fuel oil, however in its initial operating years natural gas was used extensively.

Year	2010	2011
Light fuel used	8,254 m^{3}	187,204 m^{3}
Natural gas used	136.33 million m^{3}	432.8 million m^{3}
Electricity generated	30.047 GWh	49.133 GWh

On 2 December 2020 Whitegate power station experienced a forced shutdown. Bord Gáis Energy said that the power station was expected to be offline until 31 December 2021.

== See also ==
- Energy in Ireland
- Electricity sector in Ireland
- List of power stations in the Republic of Ireland
