= Electricity sector in Ireland =

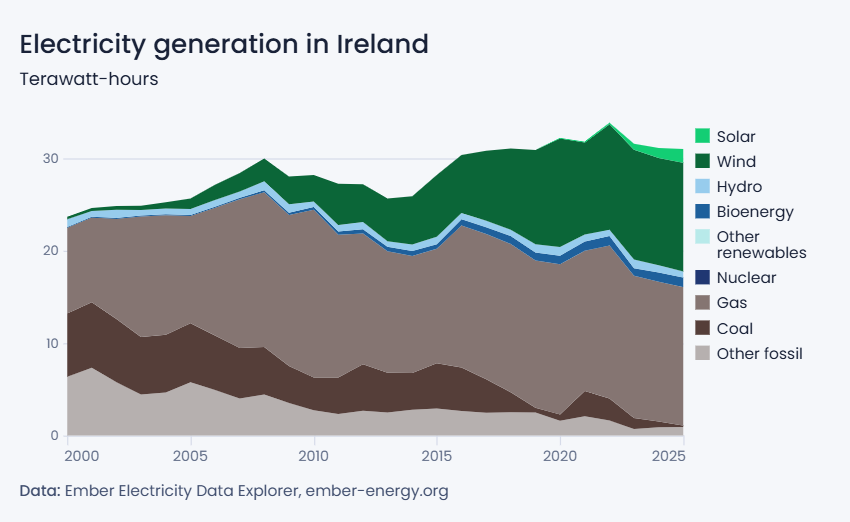
Electricity generation in Ireland in terawatt-hours

The electricity sectors of the Republic of Ireland and Northern Ireland are integrated and supply 2.5 million customers from a combination of coal, peat, natural gas, wind and hydropower. In 2022, 34 TWh were generated. In 2018 natural gas produced 51.8%, while wind turbines generated 28.1%, coal 7%, and peat 6.8% of Ireland's average electricity demand. In 2020 wind turbines generated 36.3% of Ireland's electrical demand, one of the highest wind power proportions in the world. While the United Kingdom was one of the first countries in the world to deploy commercial nuclear power plants, none were extended to Northern Ireland, while the Republic of Ireland has not built any on their side of the Irish border, therefore none are present on the island of Ireland. Nuclear power in Ireland was discussed in the 1960s and 1970s but ultimately never phased in, with legislation in the Republic of Ireland now in place explicitly forbidding its introduction.

The grid runs as a synchronous electrical grid and in terms of interconnections has undersea DC-only connections to Great Britain's National Grid, alongside plans in the advanced stage for a higher power, planned Celtic Interconnector to France. In the 2019 UK General Election 2019, the Democratic Unionist Party included in their manifesto a proposal to link Iceland to Northern Ireland (a variant on Icelink).

== Island system ==
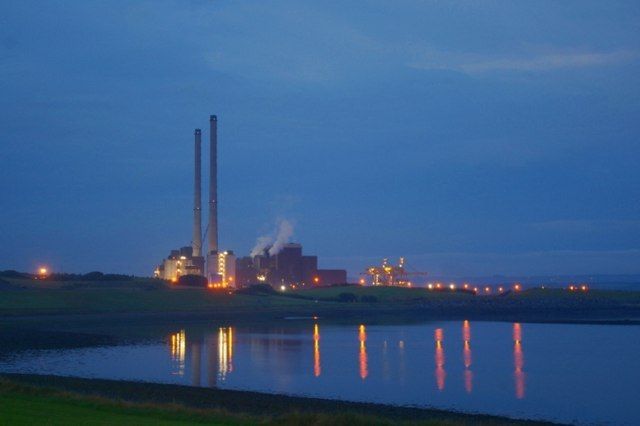
Moneypoint power station

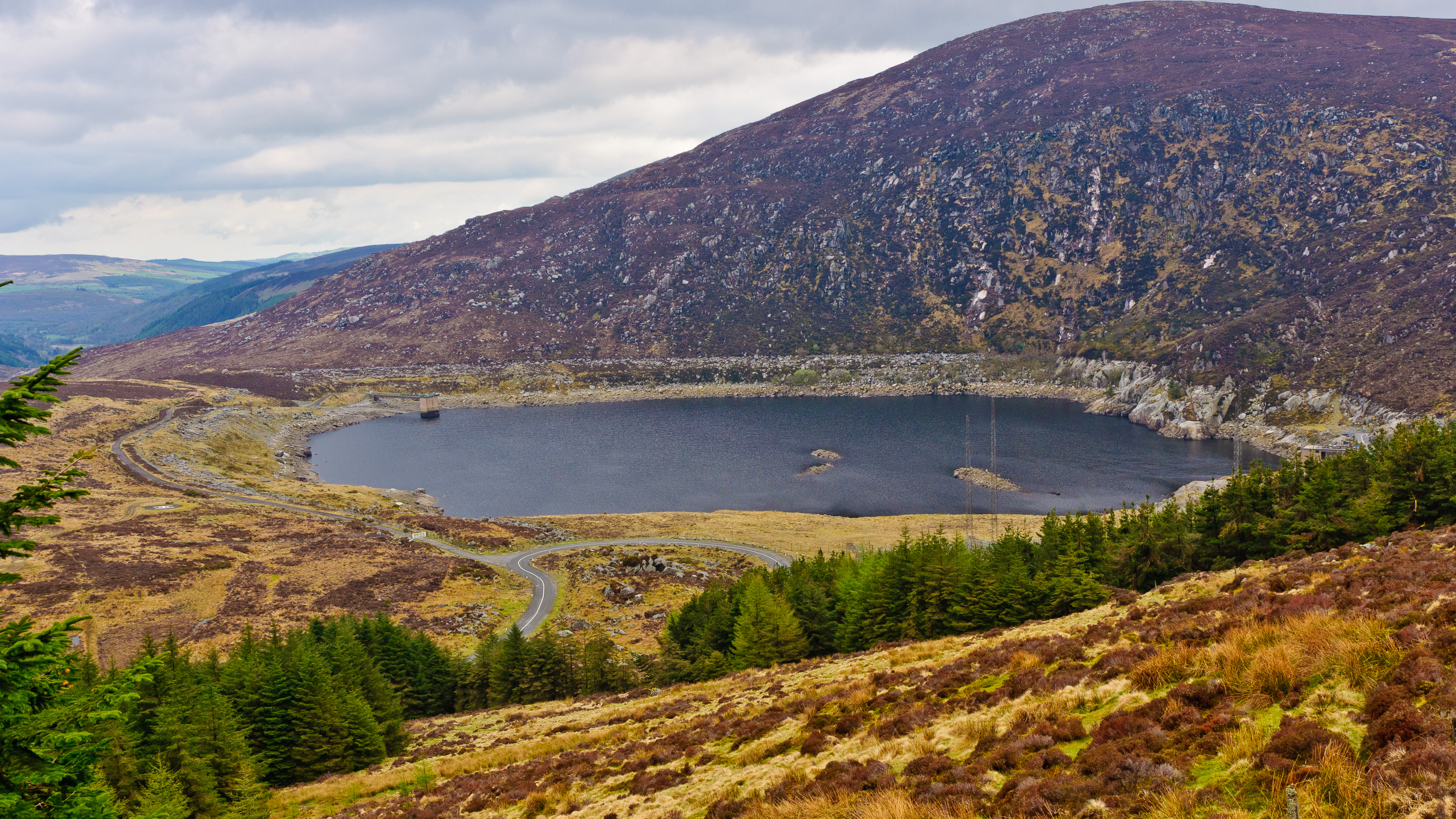
Turlough Hill Power Station

External image
- Today's demand and production

The electricity sector in Ireland previously operated as two separate markets: Northern Ireland operated as part of the UK, and the Republic of Ireland operated its own separate market. On 1 November 2007 the two Transmission System Operators (System Operator Northern Ireland and EirGrid) established the Single Electricity Market for the island of Ireland. This market has created "a gross mandatory pool market, into which all electricity generated on or imported onto the island of Ireland must be sold, and from which all wholesale electricity for consumption on or export from the island of Ireland must be purchased". According to the Electricity Association of Ireland, in 2013 the Single Electricity Market had approximately 2.5 million customers; 1.8 million in the Republic and 0.7 million in Northern Ireland. The effect of Brexit on the Single Electricity Market has yet to be defined.

Ireland and Northern Ireland form a regional group of the Europe-wide ENTSO-E organisation. The networks are not yet interconnected with the Continental Europe grid, but have interconnection with the British network through the Moyle Interconnector and the East–West Interconnector. In 2014, the island had an electricity interconnection level (international transmission capacity relative to production capacity) of 9%, below the recommended 10% level.

== Electricity in the Republic of Ireland ==
Electricity generators in the Republic of Ireland are ESB, SSE, Synergen (70% ESB), Edenderry Power, Endesa-Ireland and Huntstown (Viridian). ESB owns the transmission and distribution networks.

The transmission system operator is EirGrid plc, which assumed the role from ESB Networks on 1 July 2006. EirGrid ensures the safe, secure and economic operation of the high voltage electricity grid. EirGrid is owned by the Irish State and is established as a result of a government decision to create an independent organisation to carry out the transmission system operator function, in order to assist the liberalisation of Ireland's electricity industry and the development of a competitive market.

The electricity industry is regulated by the Commission for Regulation of Utilities which also regulates the natural gas market. The functions and duties of the commission have been altered and expanded significantly by legislation transposing EU directives into Irish law.

=== Renewable energy ===
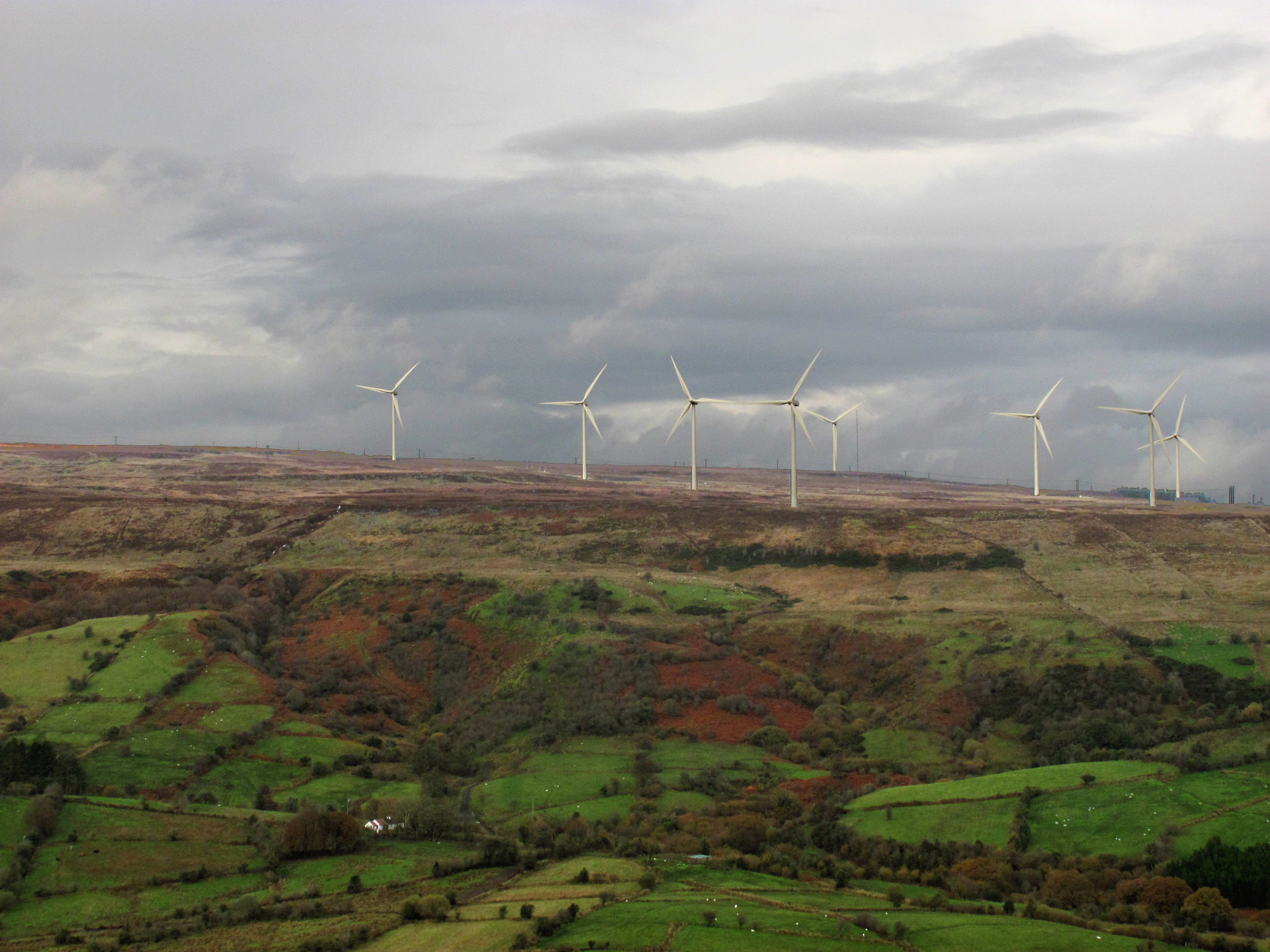
Wind turbines on County Leitrim's Corrie Mountain

Ireland renewable electricity production by source

Under the original 2009 Renewable Energy Directive Ireland had set a target of producing 16% of all its energy needs from renewable energy sources by 2020 but that has been updated by a second Renewable Energy Directive whose targets are 32% by 2030. Between 2005 and 2014 the percentage of energy from renewable energy sources grew from just 3.1% to 8.6% of total final consumption. By 2020 the overall renewable energy share was 13.5%, short of its Renewable Energy Directive target of 16%. In 2023, Ireland's overall renewable energy share was 15.3%, up from 13.1% in 2022 but still below the 2020 target of 16%. Renewable energy accounted for 14.1% of primary energy, its highest share recorded to date.

The country has a large and growing installed wind power capacity at 4,405 MW by the end of 2021 producing 31% of all its electricity needs in that year. By February 2024, there was 1 GW of solar PV capacity connected to the electricity grid. By April 2024, Ireland had 1 GW of grid-connected energy storage capacity, almost 750 MW of which was battery storage, with the remainder supplied by Turlough Hill Power Station.

==== Wind energy ====
Locations of wind farms on and around the island of Ireland

As of 2021, the island of Ireland had 5,585 MW of installed wind power capacity, with 4,309 MW in the Republic of Ireland. In 2020, wind provided over 86% of Ireland's renewable electricity and generated 36.3% of Ireland's electricity demand, one of the highest percentages globally. In 2023, Wind Energy Ireland confirmed that wind farms provided 35 per cent of Ireland and Northern Ireland's electricity in 2023, totalling a record breaking 13,725 gigawatt-hours (GWh). Ireland has over 300 wind farms, mostly onshore. A Public Service Obligation subsidy supports renewable energy and wind power development, driven by concerns over energy, security, and climate change mitigation.

=== Electricity Grid ===
The high-voltage Irish electricity transmission grid comprises 6,800 km of power lines and operates at 400 kV, 220 kV and 110 kV. Substations provide entry points to, and exits from, the transmission grid. Entry points include thermal and hydro-electric power stations, major wind farms, and inter-connectors from other countries and regions. Exit points are to lower voltage (220 kV, 110 kV, and 38 kV) transmission and distribution substations.

EirGrid is the Transmission System Operator (TSO), and ESB Networks is the Transmission Asset Owner (TAO).

There are two 400 kV lines. One is from Moneypoint power station to Woodland substation where there is a connection to the 400 kV DC East-West Interconnector. The Oldstreet 400 kV substation is an intermediate substation on this line. The second line is from Moneypoint power station to Dunstown 400 kV substation.

There are 220 kV substations at:

Aghada power station, Arklow, Arva, Ballyvouskill, Ballynahulla, Belcamp, Carrickmines, Cashla, Clashavoon, Clonee, Corduff, Cowcross, Cullenagh, Dunstown, Finglas, Flagford, Glanagow power station, Gorman, Great Island power station, Huntstown power station, Kellistown, Kilpaddoge, Killonan, Knockraha, Killonan, Lodgewood, Louth (and a connection to the 275 kV Northern Ireland grid), Maynooth, Moneypoint power station, Prospect, Raffee, Shannonbridge, Srananagh, Tarbert power station, Turlough Hill, and West Dublin.

Ireland has several grid energy storage facilities with a combined 1.1 GW power, of which some are bidding into Ireland's DS3 grid services market for frequency control.

Name	Commissioning date	Energy (MWh)	Power (MW)	Duration (hours)	Type	County	Refs
Turlough Hill	1974	1500	292	5	Pumped-storage hydroelectricity	Wicklow	
Aghada	2024	338	170	2	Battery	Cork	
Lumcloon	2021		100		Battery	Offaly	
Poolbeg	2024	150	75	2	Lithium-ion	Dublin	
Lisdrumdoagh	June 2022		60		Battery	Monaghan	
Tullahennel	April 2021		26		Lithium-ion	Kerry	
Kilathmoy	January 2020		11		Lithium-ion	Limerick/Kerry	
Stephenstown	April 2021	8.5			Lithium-ion	Dublin	

Approved projects:

Name	Commissioning date	Energy (MWh)	Power (MW)	Duration (hours)	Type	County	Refs
Inchicore	2022	60			Battery	Dublin	
South Wall	2023	60	30	2	Lithium-ion	Dublin	
Thornsberry	2025	240	120	2	Lithium-ion	Offaly	
Derrymeen	2026	200	100	2	Lithium-ion	Tyrone	
Shannonbridge	2024	160			Lithium-ion		+400 MW syncon
	2025	mwh	mw	2	Lithium-ion	Dublin	

== Electricity in Northern Ireland ==
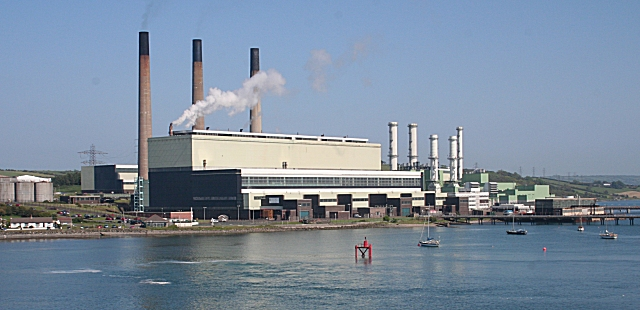
Ballylumford power station provides over half of Northern Ireland's total generating capacity, and 17% of all-Ireland capacity.

There are three power stations in Northern Ireland: Ballylumford power station, Coolkeeragh power station and Kilroot power station. Northern Ireland Electricity (a subsidiary of ESB Group) owns the transmission and distribution networks.

The single electricity market means that Northern Ireland Electricity carries electricity on its network in exchange for a regulated charge to the electricity supply company. As of September 2011, domestic customers in Northern Ireland are able to buy electricity from Electric Ireland, Power NI, Airtricity, Click Energy or Budget Energy. Industrial and commercial customers are able to choose from several other electricity suppliers.

The transmission system operator is System Operator Northern Ireland, which ensures the safe, secure and economic operation of the high voltage electricity grid. Its counterpart in the Republic of Ireland is EirGrid. Both of these are owned by EirGrid plc which also (through a joint partnership) acts as the single energy market operator, i.e., runs the new all-island wholesale market for electricity.

The electricity industry in Northern Ireland is regulated by the Northern Ireland Authority for Utility Regulation. The authority is an independent public body established to oversee and regulate the electricity, gas, water and sewerage industries in Northern Ireland. The Authority is a non-ministerial government department responsible for promoting the short and long term interests of consumers. It does not make policy, but ensures that the energy and water utility industries are regulated and developed within ministerial policies. It is governed by a board of directors and is accountable to the Northern Ireland Assembly.

== See also ==
- List of power stations in the Republic of Ireland
- Renewable energy in the Republic of Ireland
- List of high-voltage transmission links in the Republic of Ireland
- Energy law
