= Renewable energy in the Republic of Ireland =

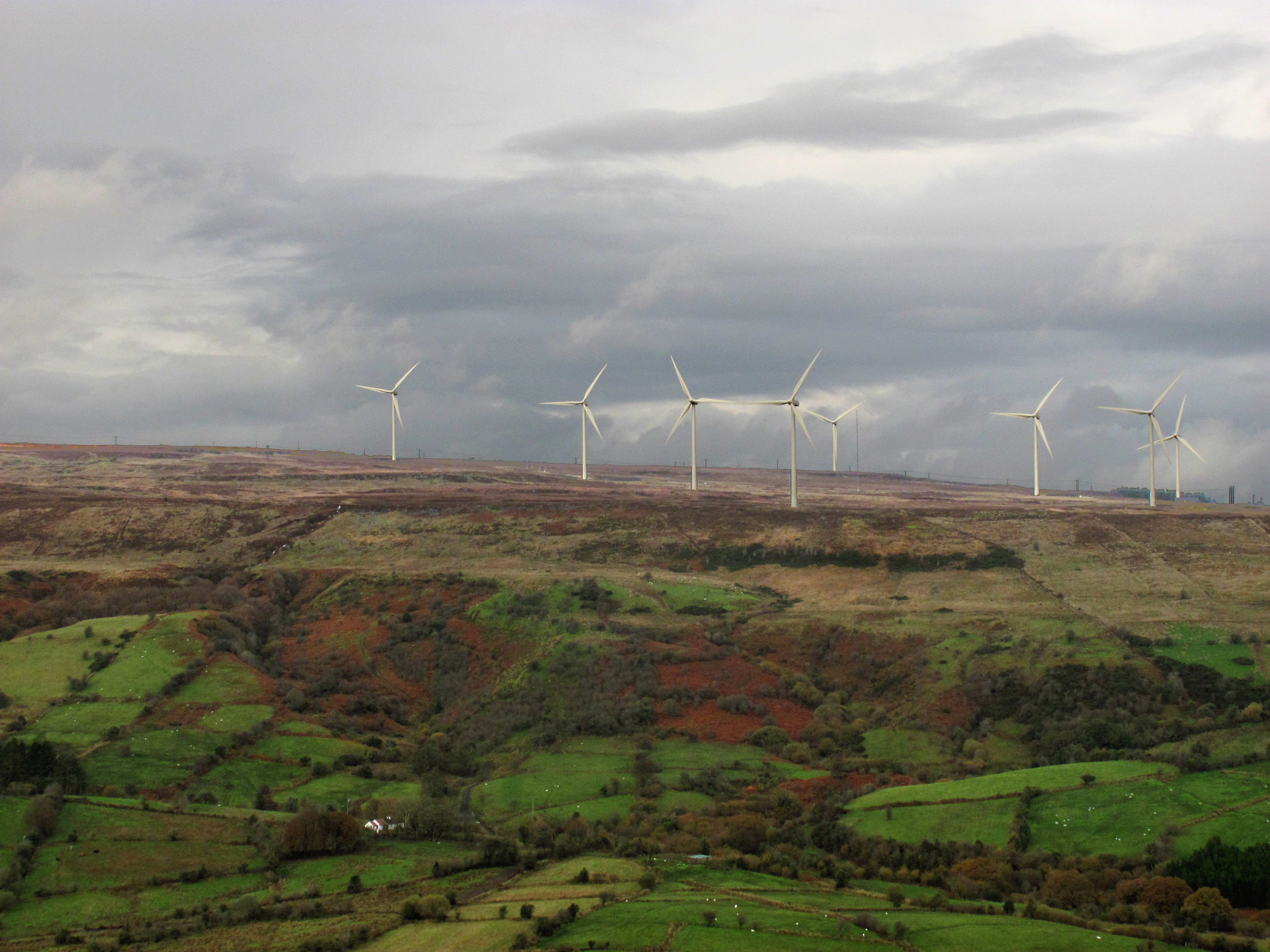
Wind turbines on County Leitrim's Corrie Mountain

Ireland renewable electricity production by source

Under the original 2009 Renewable Energy Directive Ireland had set a target of producing 16% of all its energy needs from renewable energy sources by 2020 but that has been updated by a second Renewable Energy Directive whose targets are 32% by 2030. Between 2005 and 2014 the percentage of energy from renewable energy sources grew from just 3.1% to 8.6% of total final consumption. By 2020 the overall renewable energy share was 13.5%, short of its Renewable Energy Directive target of 16%. In 2023, Ireland's overall renewable energy share was 15.3%, up from 13.1% in 2022 but still below the 2020 target of 16%. Renewable energy accounted for 14.1% of primary energy, its highest share recorded to date.

The country has a large and growing installed wind power capacity at 4,405 MW by the end of 2021 producing 31% of all its electricity needs in that year. By February 2024, there was 1 GW of solar PV capacity connected to the electricity grid. By April 2024, Ireland had 1 GW of grid-connected energy storage capacity, almost 750 MW of which was battery storage, with the remainder supplied by Turlough Hill Power Station.

== Energy consumption by sector ==
Projected total gross final energy consumption by sector in 2020.
1. Heating and cooling (36.6%)
2. Electricity (20.9%)
3. Transport (42.6%)

According to the Irish National Renewable Energy Action Plan (NREAP), as submitted by all member states as part of the EU Renewable Energy Directive, in 2020 the gross final energy consumption in Ireland by sector is projected to break down as follows:

*Projected energy use by sector in 2020	ktoe	RE 2020 target
Heating and cooling	4,931	12.0%
Electricity	2,813	42.5%
Transport	5,747	10.0%
Gross final energy consumption*	14,142	16.0%

*All figures calculated as per Directive 2009/28/EC

In 2020 the transport sector is expected to comprise 42.6% of final energy consumption. The heating and cooling sector (also known as the thermal sector) includes domestic heating and air conditioning and industrial heat processes is expected to account for 36.6% of final energy consumption The electricity sector is projected to account for 20.9% of consumption.

Total annual energy consumption (after adjustments) is projected to be 14,142 ktoe (14.142 million tonnes of oil equivalent) by 2020. To meet Ireland's overall target of16% use of renewable energy in gross final energy consumption by 2020 (it was just 3.1% in 2005) targets have been set for each sector. By 2020 renewable energy use is targeted to be 12% in the heating and cooling sector, 42.5% in the electricity sector and 10% in the transport sector.

== Sources ==
=== Wind power ===
Installed wind power capacity
Year	Cumulative Capacity (in MW)
2008	1,027
2009	1,260
2010	1,392
2011	1,631
2012	1,749
2013	2,037
2014	2,262
2015	2,486
2016	2,830
2017	3,127
2018	3,564
2019	4,155
2020	4,351
2021	4,405
2022	4,685
2023	4,802
2024	4,861

Wind power has grown steadily in the Republic of Ireland, rising from 1,027 MW in 2008 to 4,861 MW by year end 2024. The grids of the Republic and Northern Ireland are integrated, and the combined wind power capacity is 5,030 MW. During the year 2020 wind power provided 36.3% of the country's electricity On 5 February 2022 at 17:45, an all-time record was broken in Ireland, with wind generating 3,603 MW.

As of 2022 almost all wind power generation in Ireland is onshore. However, the Irish government plans to have 5 GW of offshore wind capacity built by 2030, with a goal of 35 GW by 2050.

Installed windpower capacity (MW)
2008	2009	2010	2011	2012	2013	2014	2015	2016	2017	2018	2019	2020	2021	2022	2023	2024
1,027	1,260	1,392	1,631	1,749	2,037	2,262	2,486	2,830	3,127	3,564	4,155	4,351	4,405	4,685	4,802	4,861

=== Solar PV ===
Installed solar power capacity
Year	Cumulative Capacity (in MW)
2008	0.4
2009	0.6
2010	0.6
2011	0.7
2012	0.7
2013	1.0
2014	1.1
2015	2.1
2016	5.1
2017	15.7
2018	29.0
2019	36.0
2020	89.9
2021	92.4
2022	187.9
2023	445.2
2024	1,185.0

Installed solar PV capacity (MW)
2008	2009	2010	2011	2012	2013	2014	2015	2016	2017	2018	2019	2020	2021	2022	2023	2024
0.4	0.6	0.6	0.7	0.7	1.0	1.1	2.1	5.1	15.7	29.0	36.0	89.9	92.4	187.9	445.2	1185.0

Solar PV installed capacity in Ireland is amongst the lowest in Europe, it was just over 2MW in 2015. In the same year the corresponding figure for the United Kingdom was 8,915 MW and for Denmark 790 MW. In 2015 the country had the lowest capacity per inhabitant of all EU countries, only Latvia had a lower absolute capacity. By 2024, installed solar capacity had risen to 1,185 MW, the seventh lowest level in the EU. Predictions for future growth in installed capacity varied widely from 500 MW by 2021 to 3,700 MW by 2030 with government support.

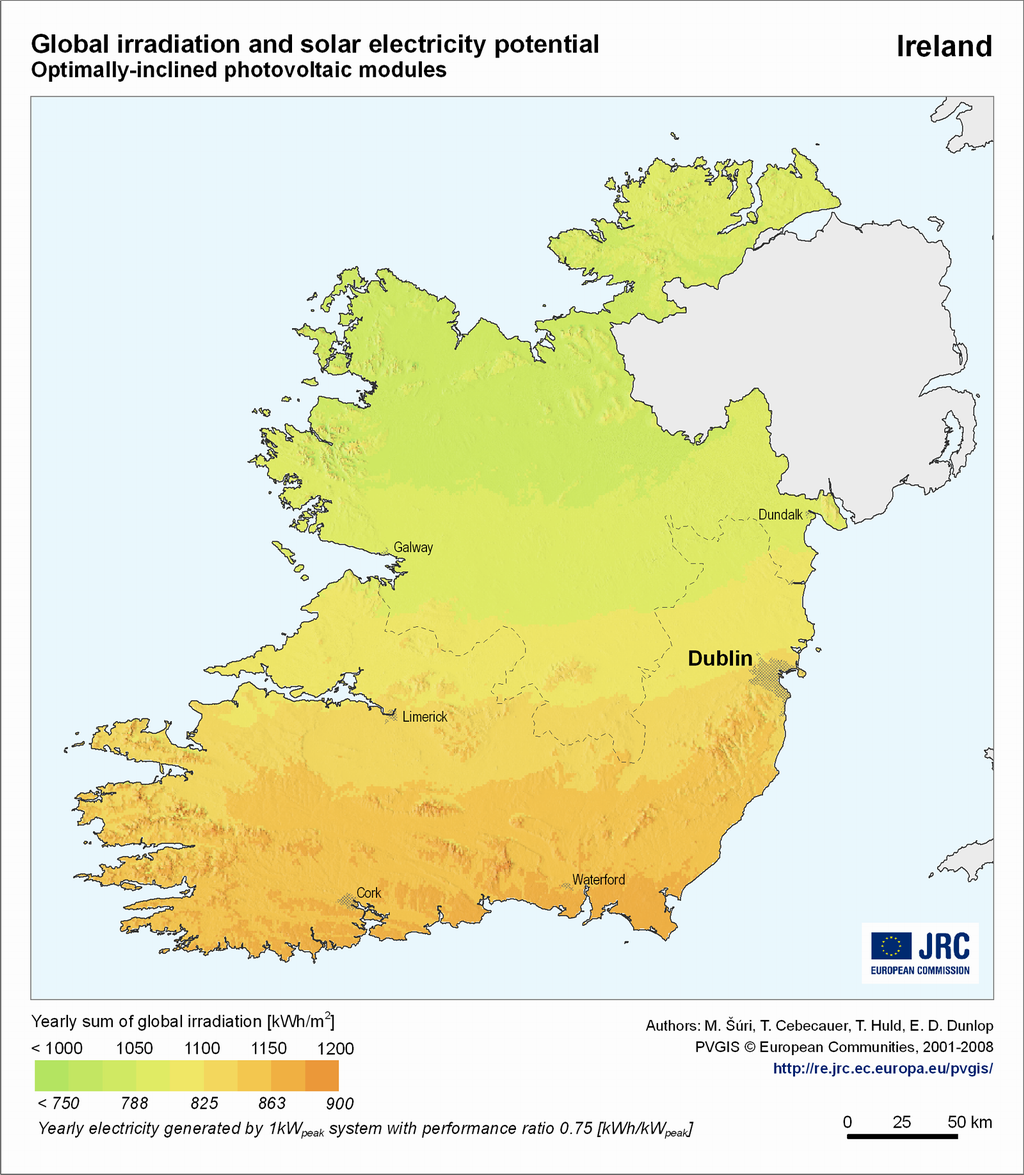
Solar radiation and photovoltaic electricity potential in Ireland using optimally inclined photovoltaic modules

=== Biomass ===
==== Solid biomass and biogas ====
Biomass use by sector 2014
	Electricity sector Gwh/ ktoe	Heating and cooling sector ktoe
Solid biomass	330/28	222
Biogas	206/18	8.1
Total	536/46	230.1

*Converted using IEA unit converter.

Solid biomass was used mostly in the heating and cooling sector providing 222 ktoe of energy, it was also used to generate some electricity at 28 ktoe of energy. Biogas was used mostly in the production of electricity contributing 18 ktoe.

==== Biofuels ====
Biofuel use in transport (ktoe)
	2013	2014
Bioethanol/ bio-ETBE	29	27
Of which Biofuels	_	_
Of which imported	29	24
Biodiesel	74	90
Of which Biofuels	73	77
Of which imported	50	67

In 2014 Biodiesel provided 90 ktoe to the transport sector whilst Bioethanol/Bio-ETBE provided 27 ktoe.

Biofuel transport policy

The Department of Transport of Ireland has implemented a 2025-2027 Renewable Transport Fuel Policy (RTFP) in an effort to meet its national EU climate targets by 2030. The main aims of this policy are to comply with the National Climate and Energy Policy and to reduce the use of fossil fuels and greenhouse gas emissions in the transport sector. The policy preceding the RTFO was the Biofuel Obligation Scheme introduced in 2010, which laid the groundwork for the current changes which require road transport fuels to consist of a certain percentage of renewable biofuels in their fuel blends. The current aim is to have at least 10% of Petrol and 12% of Diesel to consist of Biofuels in the transport sector.

In 2023, 8.6% of total transport energy consumption contained biofuels. The renewable fuel typically consist of waste such as vegetable oil or plant oil, which supports waste management policies by finding a new use for this sector of residue. While the eventual climate strategy of Ireland revolves around electric vehicles, the current steps taken for sustainability are regarding the implementation of biofuels into the transport sector.

== Targets and Progress ==
=== Targets ===
Renewable energy targets and projected consumption (%) 2005–2020, NREAP.
	2005	2010	2011	2012	2013	2014	2015	2016	2017	2018	2019	2020
RES- Heating and Cooling (%)	3.50%	4.30%	4.90%	6.10%	6.90%	7.70%	8.90%	9.70%	10.10%	10.50%	11.20%	12.00%
RES-Electricity(%)	6.90%	20.40%	24.60%	25.30%	30.50%	31.00%	32.40%	32.20%	33.80%	37.50%	37.30%	42.50%
RES-Transport(%)	0.00%	3.00%	3.90%	4.60%	5.10%	5.50%	5.90%	6.60%	7.40%	8.10%	8.80%	10.00%
Overall RES(%)	3.10%	6.60%	8.10%	9.00%	10.50%	11.00%	11.80%	12.20%	12.90%	14.00%	14.40%	16.00%

Overall renewable energy sources show a target trajectory of 6.6% share in 2010 rising to 14% by 2020. The electricity sector shows the most ambitious trajectory with a rise from 6.9% of total supply in 2005 to 42.5% by 2020.

=== Progress ===
Renewable energy results and actual consumption (%) 2013,2014.
	2013	2014
RES- Heating and Cooling (%)	5.50%	6.60%
RES- Electricity (%)	20.80%	22.70%
RES- Transport (%)	4.90%	5.20%
Overall RES share (%)	7.60%	8.60%

According to Ireland's third progress report, by 2014 the country had achieved an 8.6% share of overall energy use from renewable energy sources. This was below the targeted 11% share planned for that year. Renewable energy use in the electricity sector was the furthest from its target of just over 8 percentage points below its target for the year.

In 2020 Ireland reached its renewable electricity target averaging at 40% renewable through the year (mostly from wind). Heating and cooling and transport targets were not reached.

By 2023, the overall renewable energy share had risen to 15.3%, compared with 13.1% in 2022. Renewable energy accounted for 14.1% of primary energy in 2023, while wind generation accounted for 33.7% of gross electricity supply.

== See also ==
- Wind power in Ireland
- Energy in Ireland
- Electricity sector in Ireland
- Renewable energy in the UK
- Renewable energy in Scotland
- Renewable energy by country
