= Aghada =

Village in County Cork, Ireland

Aghada Áth Fhada
- Village
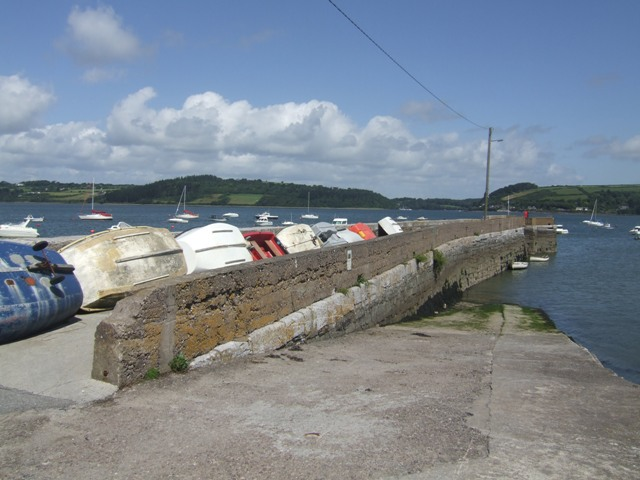
- Lower Aghada Pier

- Location in Ireland
- Coordinates: 51°50′N 8°13′W
- Country: Ireland
- Province: Munster
- County: County Cork
- Dáil Constituency: Cork East
- EU Parliament: South

Population (2022)
  - Total: 1,159
- (includes the bordering villages of Rostellan and Farsid)
- Time zone: UTC+0 (WET)
  - Summer (DST): UTC-1 (IST (WEST))
- Irish grid reference: W855656

Aghada (Irish: Áth Fhada, meaning 'long ford') is a village and civil parish in County Cork, Ireland. It is situated on the eastern side of Cork Harbour, around 12 km by road south of Midleton.

The civil parish of Aghada consists of several small villages and townlands including Saleen, Rostellan, Farsid, Upper Aghada, Lower Aghada, Whitegate, Guileen and Ballinrostig. There are several amenity sites in the area, including Rostellan Woods and Saleen Creek, as well as a number of beaches such as Inch Bay, White Bay, and Guileen Strand. Aghada is within the Cork East Dáil constituency.

There is a Presbyterian church in Upper Aghada. During World War I the Royal Munster Fusiliers (reserves) were garrisoned in Aghada, and there was a United States Naval Air Station in the area. William Cosgrove, a World War I recipient of the Victoria Cross, is buried in Upper Aghada cemetery.

Aghada power station was originally built in the early 1980s and produced up to 577 MW through the burning of natural gas and diesel. An additional gas-powered 430 MW CCGT unit was completed in 2010, making Aghada station one of the largest power stations in the Republic of Ireland.

The area has a tennis club and is the home to the Aghada GAA club. The Aghada ladies' football team won the 2024 county championship (Cork LGFA), beating Éire Óg in the final.

== Notable people ==
Notable people from the area include Gaelic football manager Conor Counihan, footballers Pearse O'Neill and Kieran O'Connor, and brothers Declan and Ciaran O'Shea of the rock band Cyclefly.
