= Barryroe =

Oil field in the Celtic Sea

Barryroe oil and gas field
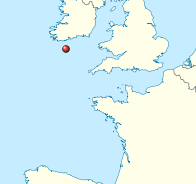
- Country: Ireland
- Region: Celtic Sea
- Offshore/onshore: Offshore
- Coordinates: 51.18°N 8.4°W
- Partners: Providence 80% Lansdowne 20%

Field history
- Discovery: 1981

Production
- Estimated oil in place: 1,000 - 1,600 million barrels (~−220,000,000 t)
- Recoverable oil: 311 million barrels (~4.24×10^{7} t)
- Recoverable gas: 207×10^{9} cu ft (5.9×10^{9} m^{3})

Barryroe is an undeveloped oil and gas field in the Atlantic Ocean due south of County Cork, Ireland. Close to the exhausted Kinsale Head gas field, it is as close as 3 kilometres (1.9 mi) to the Kinsale Head existing pipeline. The discovery is at a water depth of 100 metres (330 ft). Several attempts were made to find a commercial field at the site in the 1970s, but, although they struck oil, none were commercially viable. It has been rated as the equivalent of a large North Sea oil field.

By 2020, the field was 80% owned by Providence Resources (via subsidiary Exola) and 20% by Lansdowne Oil and Gas (via subsidiary Lansdowne Celtic Sea).

Providence has long been seeking a partner to finance development of Barryroe. In 2015, it attempted partnership with Sequa Resources and, in 2018–2020, partnered with Chinese APEC Energy, both without success.

In 2022, Providence rebranded themselves as Barryroe Offshore Energy.

Providence estimated the total reserve in place between 1 and 1.6 billion barrels (160×10^{6} and 250×10^{6} m^{3}) in July 2012. In April 2013, an independent audit estimated the recoverable total at 311 million barrels (49.4×10^{6} m^{3}) barrels of oil and 207 billion cubic feet (5.9 billion cubic metres) of gas. This gives a total of 346 million barrels (55.0×10^{6} m^{3}) of oil equivalent.
