= Irish National Petroleum Corporation =

Semi-defunct Irish State company

The Irish National Petroleum Corporation (INPC) is a semi-defunct Irish State-owned company which owned and operated the Whiddy Island Terminal on Whiddy Island and Whitegate refinery at Whitegate, both in County Cork, Ireland. It was founded in 1979 and was involved in acquiring oil, refining it, and distributing petroleum products to consumers in Ireland. Its main assets were sold to TOSCO Corp (later Phillips Petroleum) in 2001.

As of 2020, the INPC has no staff, but has an active three-person board who manage a portion of the proceeds from the 2001 sale which was set aside for ongoing liabilities and claims.

== History ==
The Whitegate Oil Refinery, built in 1959, was threatened to be closed by its private owners in the early 1980s. To avoid closure of Ireland's only refinery, and become completely reliant on foreign imports, the refinery was purchased by the INPC in 1982. The Fuels (Control of Supplies) Order 1982 mandated that all importers of petroleum to Ireland purchase a proportion from the INPC, to ensure the refinery's success.

The INPC acquired the Whiddy Island Terminal, destroyed in the 1979 Whiddy Island disaster, in 1985, which it repaired and reopened by 1998.

The National Oil Reserves Agency (NORA) was created in 1995 as a subsidiary of INPC and as of 2020 continues to manage Ireland's strategic oil reserves.

Government philosophy later shifted away from owning strategic assets and towards privatisation, and in 1999 the INPC was asked by Minister for Public Enterprise Mary O'Rourke to investigate alternative commercial opportunities for its assets. In 2000, American multinational TOSCO Corp announced its intention to acquire the INPC's assets (excluding NORA), which was completed in 2001.
