= Shannon Foynes Port =

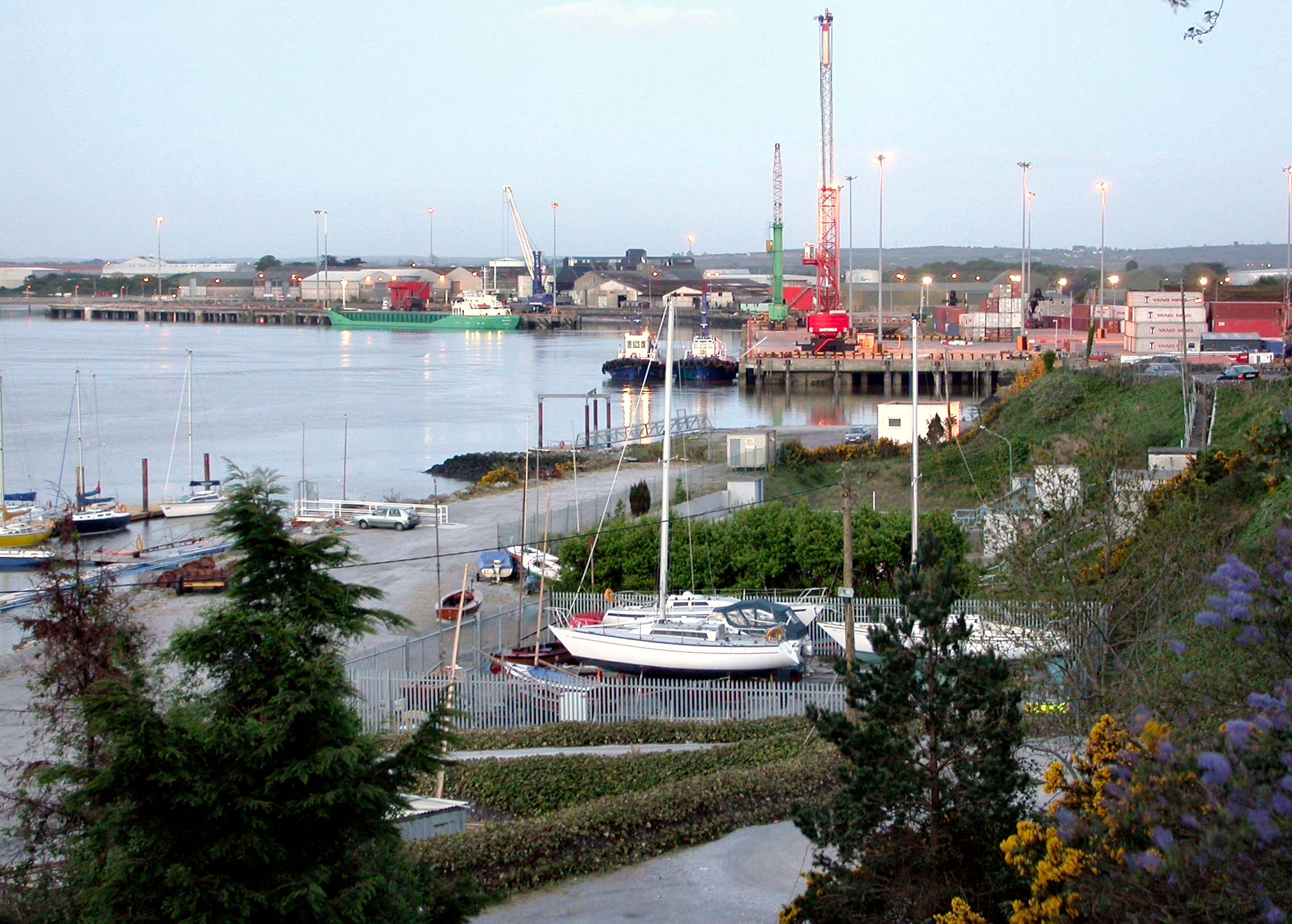
- Interactive map of Shannon Foynes Port
- Location within Ireland

Location
- Country: Ireland
- Location: Foynes, County Clare
- Coordinates: 52°36′50″N 9°06′11″W
- UN/LOCODE: IESNN

Details
- Operated by: Shannon Foynes Port Company
- Type of Harbor: Estuary
- Draft depth: draft 20.0 m.
- CEO: Pat Keating

Statistics
- Website; Official website

Shannon Foynes Port (Irish: Calafort na Sionainne agus Fhainge) is a port operating company managing the operations of cargo facilities within the Shannon Estuary. It is the second largest port in Ireland. It is operated and managed by the Shannon Foynes Port Company (SFPC), whose main operating office is based in Foynes, County Limerick. SFPC has statutory jurisdiction over all marine activities in the estuary between a line drawn from Kerry Head to Loop Head, and Limerick.

== Port layout ==
The port has facilities at

- Foynes Harbour
- Limerick
- Shannon Airport Jetty
- Aughinish Island
- Tarbert Island and
- Moneypoint

=== Foynes ===
Foynes was first surveyed in 1837 and was identified as a potential port development location. The initial substantial works were carried out in 1846, with the construction of a masonry wharf 83m long and 12m wide, in the location now known as the West Quay. This wall is still in place at berth 1.

The Shannon Act 1885, an Act of Parliament in the reign of Queen Victoria, was passed to transfer the operation, control and ownership of Foynes Harbour from the Commissioners of Public Works in Ireland. The Foynes Harbour Trustees were established in 1890. The Trustees proceeded immediately to construct a timber jetty extending Northwards from the Masonry Quay. In 1915 the Trustees constructed a concrete Eastern Spur parallel to the Masonry Quay.

In 1933, the Trustees acquired a Foreshore Lease from the State in order to construct a new jetty extending Northwards from the existing West and East Spurs, and completed this concrete piled structure in 1936. This was designed to cater for 8,000-ton vessels with maximum draft of 7.6m. In 1968 the Trustees constructed the East Jetty under Foreshore Licence; this was principally for the provision of a berth to service ore exports and included a conveyor and loading arm.

In 1984, the East Jetty was extended Westwards to cater for the growing number of ships calling at the harbour. A dedicated Oil Dolphin facility was constructed in 1992 and provided a berth for oil and chemical tankers. The new West Quay was completed in 1999.

Shannon Foynes Port handles more than €7 billion in trade annually, according to a report by W2 Consulting, based on 2014 figures from SFPC and 31 companies using it. Shannon Foynes Port Company and its customers plan to spend €277 million over five years to 2019, which will support 3,372 jobs in the region.

The SFPC intends to spend €130 million on an expansion plan, dubbed Vision 2041, that will exploit advantages such as its deep water and sheltered harbours to develop an international trade hub there. In May 2022, Bechtel was hired to update the plan, including facilities as an offshore wind port.

=== Other estuary terminals ===
There are four user-owned terminals on the Estuary.

- The jetty at Tarbert was commissioned in 1969 to serve the oil-fuelled power station constructed there. It is planned to convert the generating station to gas but fuel storage facilities are being maintained by the National Oil Reserves Agency (NORA).
- Across the Estuary from Tarbert, on the County Clare side, lies Moneypoint terminal, a dedicated facility for coal used to fuel the Irish state-owned (ESB) generating station on site. The plant went into full production during 1987.
- Close to Foynes, at Aughinish Island, the jetty dedicated to bauxite and alumina cargoes was constructed to serve the Russian owned Aughinish Alumina plant which went into production in 1983.
- The SFPC (Shannon Foynes Port Company) Terminal adjacent to Shannon Airport was commissioned in 1973 to service aviation fuel imports

== See also ==
- Oil terminals in Ireland
