= Aghada Power Station =

Generation facility in County Cork, Ireland

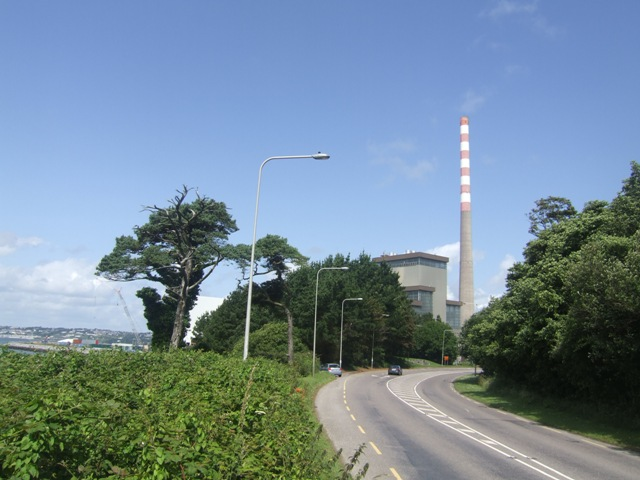
- Country: Ireland
- Location: County Cork
- Coordinates: 51.8356°N 8.2345°W
- Status: Operational
- Commission date: 1980; 2010 (Upgraded)
- Construction cost: £100 Million (1980) €360 Million (2010)
- Owner: Electricity Supply Board
- Operator: Electricity Supply Board
- Employees: 80 (2010)

Thermal power station
- Primary fuel: Natural gas
- Secondary fuel: Distillate oil
- Turbine technology: Steam turbine Gas turbine
- Chimneys: 5
- Combined cycle?: Yes

Power generation
- Units operational: 1 x 270 MW Alsthom gas-fired conventional steam turbine (1980); 3 x 90 MW Alsthom Frame 9B, dual fuel open cycle gas turbines (1980s); 1 x 435 MW Alsthom single shaft combined cycle gas turbine (2010)
- Make and model: Alsthom
- Nameplate capacity: 963 MW

External links
- Commons: Related media on Commons

Aghada power station is a gas-fired power station located near the entrance of Cork Harbour in Aghada, County Cork. It was built at this location in order to use gas that had been discovered at the nearby Kinsale Head gas field, from which gas was extracted from 1978 until its depletion in 2020.

The station has been operational since 1980, and in 2010 underwent a major upgrade which saw the output capacity almost double thanks to a new combined cycle gas turbine (CCGT). According to its owner, the ESB Group, these upgrades saw it become one of the "largest and most efficient" power stations in Ireland.

== History ==
Aghada generating station began operation in the early 1980s with a capacity of 577 MW. The plant consists of a single 270 MW conventional steam turbine and three 85 MW open-cycle gas turbines. The plant is fuelled with natural gas, which is supplied from the Bórd Gais network and diesel oil is used as an alternative fuel when natural gas supply is low.

=== 2010 upgrade ===
In May 2010, the Minister for Foreign Affairs, Micheál Martin, opened a new combined cycle gas turbine at the plant. The new CCGT was a major upgrade to the power station and provided a new base-load generating capacity to meet rising power demand in Ireland. With a capacity of 435 MW the new CCGT brought the total capacity of the power plant from 528 MW to 963 MW. The CCGT generates enough power to meet the electricity needs of around 450,000 homes.

The CCGT is a GT26 provided by Alstom. The upgrade was part of the ESB's portfolio restructuring programme, which included the closure and divestment of older and less efficient power stations.

ESB also installed two grid batteries; a 19MW/38MWh in 2022, and a 150MW/300MWh in 2024.

Following the upgrades, Aghada consists of the following four types of technology:

- 1 x 270 MW Alstom gas-fired conventional steam turbine (1980)
- 3 x 90 MW Alstom Frame 9B, dual fuel open cycle gas turbines (1980s)
- 1 x 435 MW Alstom single shaft combined cycle gas turbine (2010)
- 1 x 170 MW batteries

== Proposals ==
In September 2022 the ESB announced that they were to submit a planning application with Cork County Council before the end of 2022 for the construction of a new open cycle gas turbine. The OCGT is to be within the existing grounds of Aghada power station and will be expected to generate 299 MW.
