= Jamesbrook =

Townland in Rostellan, County Cork, Ireland

Coordinates: 51.861°N 8.179°W

Jamesbrook (Irish: Sruthán Shéamais) is a townland in the civil parish of Garranekinnefeake, in the historical Barony of Imokilly, in County Cork, Ireland. As of the 2011 census, the townland of Jamesbrook had a population of 39 people.

Historically the townland was the location of an estate, Jamesbrook estate, which belonged to the Earl of Inchiquin. A house, Jamesbrook Hall, was originally built on the estate in the late 17th century by Michael Goold. It was reputedly built during the short reign of King James II, hence its name. Goold originally rented the estate, but subsequently bought the land. The property remained in the family after he died in 1722. A new manor house was built on the estate in the late 18th century. Michael Goold's daughter Frances married Wallis Adams (1749-1818). Their son, Michael Goold Adams, occupied the estate in 1814.

== See also ==
- East Ferry, County Cork (in the neighbouring townland of Garranekinefeake)
- Saleen, County Cork (village)
