= Kinsale Head gas field =

Irish gas field in the Celtic Sea

Coordinates: 50.5022°N 7.9144°W

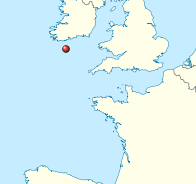
- Country: Ireland
- Region: Celtic Sea
- Offshore/onshore: Offshore
- Operators: Kinsale Energy Limited

Field history
- Discovery: 1971
- Start of production: October 1978
- Peak year: 1995
- Abandonment: July 2020

Production
- Peak of production (gas; billion cubic meters per year): 2.8

The Kinsale Head gas field is a depleted offshore natural gas field in the Celtic Sea, located 50 km (31 mi) off the southern coast of County Cork, Ireland. Discovered in 1971 near the Old Head of Kinsale, it met Ireland's gas needs until 1996. The gas field is located in a water depth of 100 metres and 1,000 metres below the seabed.

The field extends over Blocks 49/16, 48/20, 48/25, 49/21. The reservoir is a Lower Cretaceous sandstone (Wealden and Greensand) lying at a depth of 2,700 to 3,100 feet. The gas composition was >99% methane with a calorific value of 1.012 Btu/ cubic foot.

During its 42 years in operation, the Kinsale gas field produced an estimated 2 trillion cubic feet (57 billion cubic metres) of natural gas. Operator Kinsale Energy Limited extracted its last commercial quantity of gas on 5 July 2020, after which they ceased production. Decommissioning works began immediately afterwards and, as of 2021, were expected to conclude in 2023. These works included the removal of both platforms, the bulk of which had been removed during 2022.

A floating wind turbine project is proposed for development in the area.

== History ==
Marathon Oil's Irish subsidiary Marathon Petroleum Ireland Ltd., started exploring for oil off the south coast of Ireland and in 1971 instead of finding oil, gas was found off the Old Head of Kinsale by the drill ship Glomar North Sea. The discovery was confirmed as being commercially viable. Bord Gáis Éireann was established in 1975 and confirmed by the Oireachtas in 1976 under The Gas Act (1976) as the supplier and distributor of gas in Ireland. Gas came on stream in 1978.

The field was developed through two offshore installations.

Kinsale offshore installations
Platform	Block	Coordinates	Function	Type	Legs	Well slots	Installed	Production start	Production capacity	Production to
Kinsale A	49/16	51°22’15”N 07°56’43”W	Drilling, processing and accommodation	Steel jacket	8	9 (7 used)	April 1977	October 1978	5.1×10^{6} m^{3} (180×10^{6} ft^{3}) per day	Inch Beach via 35-mile 24-inch pipeline
Kinsale B	48/20	51°21’39”N 08°00’56”W	Drilling, processing and accommodation	Steel jacket	8	9 (7 used)	May 1977	November 1979	2.5×10^{6} m^{3} (90×10^{6} ft^{3}) per day	Kinsale A via 3-mile 24-inch pipeline

The process plant comprises a gas/liquid separator, gas is dehydrated in a glycol dehydrator.

Production of gas (in million cubic feet)

Peak production occurred in 1995.

In 2008, the gas field was proposed as a potential place for the purpose of carbon dioxide capture and storage.

A number of small fields now feed the Kinsale Head platforms including Ballycotton (discovered 1991), Southwest Kinsale (1999) and Seven Heads (2003). Southwest Kinsale was later used for gas storage, primarily for the winter months. These subsea completions are summarized in the following table.

Kinsale subsea completions
Name	Location	Coordinates	Water depth	No. of wellheads	Production start	Production to
Ballycotton	48/20	51.45194N 8.12456W	87 m	1	1991	Kinsale Head Bravo
South West Kinsale	48/25	50.32711N 8.09843W	93 m	3	2001	Kinsale Head Bravo
Greensand	48/25	51.32642N 8.09909W	93 m	1	2003	Kinsale Head Bravo
Seven Heads	48/24	51.1968N 8.33418W	93 m	5	2003	Kinsale Head Alpha

Petronas acquired Marathon's Irish operation in 2009. The nearby discovery at Barryroe is controlled by Providence Resources.
