= Irish Conservation Box =

The Irish Conservation Box (ICB) or Biologically Sensitive Area (BSA) is a Marine Protected Area stretching along the southwest coast of Ireland. The ICB was defined based on advice from marine biologists, and following review by European Union fisheries ministers of the Common Fisheries Policy, as a means to safeguard the "biological sensitivity and commercial importance" of the waters around Ireland.

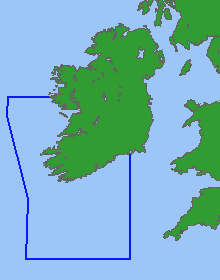
Outline of ICB (in blue) relative to the Irish coastline

== Location ==
Extended from Irish territorial waters, and comprising an area of more than 100,000 square kilometres (39,000 sq mi), the ICB stretches from Waterford Harbour to Slyne Head, and follows the 200-metre (110-fathom) bathymetric contour line along its western side.

Fishing by certain vessels and vessel types is restricted in this area, and vessels over 10 metres (33 ft) long are required to report their catch and movements to the Irish Fisheries' patrol. The Irish Naval Service is tasked with enforcing the special protection measures.

== Background ==
The Irish Conservation Box replaces a previous protection zone - known as "the Irish Box" - which was a larger rectangular 50-mile zone around the whole coast of the island of Ireland and included waters reaching to the western coasts of Scotland, England and Wales.

Under the (original) Irish box mandate, important spawning and nursery areas for many stocks were protected by - for example - limiting fishing in the zone to no more than 40 foreign vessels at any one time.

Because of common and "free-movement" policies of the EU, certain countries expected access to the zone in the long-term. As a result, there was ongoing lobbying by Spanish and Portuguese politicians of the Committee on Fisheries to remove the limits, and it was effectively abolished in late 2002.

As part of a 2003 review of the Common Fisheries Policy, and after intense negotiations on a proposal by the then Minister for Communications, Energy and Natural Resources, the Fisheries Council accepted the position that protection of biologically sensitive areas was critical to a conservation policy.

The renewed Irish Conservation Box regulations came into force in 2004.

== See also ==
- Overfishing
- Marine Stewardship Council
- Tragedy of the commons
- Celtic Sea
