= Oil terminals in Ireland =

Oil terminals are a key component of the energy supply industry in Ireland which is extensively based on the import, production and distribution of refined petroleum products. Some crude oil is imported for processing at Ireland's only oil refinery. Because Ireland has limited fossil fuel resources, these oil terminals balance the energy supply of the country.

Major oil terminals in Ireland are found at Bantry Bay, Dublin Port and Shannon Estuary. These terminals developed rapidly in the late 20th century.

== Background ==
Oil terminals are key facilities for the import, export, storage, blending, transfer and distribution of oil and petroleum products. Terminals are located at coastal sites to facilitate the offloading and loading of coastal shipping. Most terminals have road tanker loading equipment for local distribution of products to industrial, commercial and domestic users. The products handled include petrol, diesel, jet kerosene, fuel oil and heating oil.

== History ==
=== 1960s - Early Development ===
In the 1960s, many oil companies, like Gulf Oil, recognized Ireland as an important focal point location for transshipment because of how it is positioned with the Atlantic.

=== 1970s - Expansion ===
Ireland began to quickly expand oil storage in the 1970 because of the high demand caused across the globe for energy products. This was caused by a lot of uncertainty with energy supplies.

Also, this time period showed the importance of having enough storage and distribution capacity to maintain its contributions with the international market.

==== 1980’s - Investments ====
Companies invested millions in order to upgrade Irish oil terminals. In 1984, the American energy company Chevron made a major investment of $60 million in order to restore a terminal that was damaged by a past accident.

== List of oil terminals in Ireland ==
The table summarizes details of the location and operation of the oil terminals in Ireland.

Oil terminals in Ireland
Terminal	Location	Operator	Facilities and operations	References
Bantry Bay	Reenrour, Bantry, County Cork	Zenith Energy	Total capacity 1,400,000 m^{3}, 19 tanks, size 241 to 97,675 m^{3}, Single point mooring buoy. Gasoline, Diesel, jet fuel. Land area 1,397,843 m^{2}	
Dublin Airport	Dublin Airport, Swords, County Dublin	Circle K	Storage 15,000 m^{3}, 3 tanks, hydrant system for fuelling	
Dublin Port	Dublin Port, Dublin, County Dublin	Valero / Applegreen	Marine terminal, common jetty. 18 storage tanks: 4 gasoline, 2 ethanol, 5 Jet A1, 6 Diesel. Terminal built by Esso 1950	
Dublin Port	Dublin Port, Dublin, County Dublin	Irving Oil	Vessels to 55,000 Dead Weight Tonnes (DWT)	
Foynes	Foynes, County Limerick	Atlantic Fuel Supply Company	Total storage capacity 84,000 m^{3}, 18 tanks, 2 jetties, vessels up to 35,000 DWT. Diesel, ethanol, FAME (biodiesel), fuel oil, gas oil, jet fuel, gasoline, petrol	
Galway	Galway Harbour Enterprise Park, Galway, County Galway	Circle K	Total capacity 50,995 m^{3}, 25 tanks. Petroleum products, bitumen. Vessels 4,000 to 6,000 DWT. Built 2009.	
Shannon Foynes Port	Foynes, County Limerick	Exolum	Total storage 14,235 m^{3}, 13 tanks, 750 m^{3} to 3,500 m^{3}. Oil products and ethanol. Maximum 10,000 DWT	
Tarbert Power Station	Tarbert, County Kerry	SSE	Four Heavy fuel oil tanks leased by NORA	
Whitegate refinery	Whitegate, East Cork, County Cork	Irving Oil	Tank farm associated with Whitegate oil refinery	

== Major Terminal Locations ==
=== Bantry Bay (Whiddy Island) ===
Bantry Bay holds one of Ireland' s deep-water facilities which allows for the use of bigger oil tankers. The Bantry Bay terminal has always played a role in the storage of oil and transshipment. It is located in County Cork.

=== Dublin Port ===
Along the North Wall of Dublin, there are many oil storage facilities that were developed in the 20th Century. These many facilities are important for the distribution of petroleum products in the capital of Dublin.

=== Shannon Foynes ===
The terminals located along the Shannon Estuary have contributed extensively to the resilience of the country’s energy supply, especially during periods of economic uncertainty.

== Strategic oil reserves ==
Under the National Oil Reserves Agency Act 2007 the National Oil Reserves Agency (NORA) is responsible for ensuring that Ireland retains a minimum of 90 days stock of oil and petroleum products in the event that supplies are disrupted. The Department of Climate, Energy and the Environment (DECC) specifies annually the volumes of oil stocks to be held by NORA. The current minimum (2021) level of stock is:

- 1,416,340 tonnes of refined product, (Petrol, Diesel, Gas Oil, Kerosene, and Jet Fuel)
- 70,000 tonnes of Crude Oil.

The National Oil Reserves Agency holds about 72% of its oil stocks in Ireland, and the balance abroad. In Ireland stocks are held in some of the above oil storage facilities including Dublin, Cork (Whitegate Refinery), Whiddy Island (Bantry Bay), Foynes, Shannon, Tarbert (power station), and Galway. Stocks are also held at Derry and Kilroot in Northern Ireland.

== Oil imports ==
The total import of oil and oil products into Ireland over the period 1990 to 2019 is shown by the graph. The quantity is in thousand tonnes of oil equivalent.

Total import of oil and oil products into Ireland in thousand tonnes of oil equivalent

== Past Incidents and Safety/Regulation ==
In 1974, an oil spill occurred in Bantry Bay, which resulted in environmental damages around the coastline. 2,500 tons of oil were released. This led to many questions being raised regarding the safety and operation of oil terminals.

The Whiddy Island disaster was an explosion that occurred with the oil tanker Betelgeuse that happened while unloading at an oil terminal. This accident led to 50 lives being lost and significant damage in the surrounding region. A tribunal Inquiry by Justice Costello analyzed the incident a year after the incident and discussed the implications for the industrial safety of Ireland.

Oil terminals in Ireland then began to follow a framework of national and European regulations. The control of Major Accident Hazards (COMAH) apply to sites that store and process hazardous substances. Their regulations come from the European Union’s Seveso III Directive. Under COMAH, oil terminals are required to have safety management systems and conduct risk assessments. Facilities that are classified as “Upper-Tier” under COMAH’s basis have to follow even stricter regulations.

It is worth mentioning that the liquids at these oil terminals have to be maintained and treated within certain conditions under the Dangerous Substances Act 1972.

== The Energy Transition ==
In the 21st century, Ireland started to implement decarbonization. Big ports where major oil terminals are located can prove beneficial when dealing with the distribution of greener energy. Shannon Foynes started to develop a plan for a green hydrogen supply chain that can go into the European market.

== See also ==
- Shannon Foynes Port
- Oil terminals
- Oil terminals in the United Kingdom (for oil terminals in Northern Ireland)
- List of power stations in the Republic of Ireland
