= Northern Ireland Authority for Utility Regulation =

Public organization in Ireland

The Northern Ireland Authority for Utility Regulation, often known as the Utility Regulator, is an independent public body established to oversee and regulate the electricity, gas, water and sewerage industries in Northern Ireland. The Utility Regulator is a non-ministerial government department responsible for promoting the short and long term interests of consumers. It does not make policy, but ensures that the energy and water utility industries are regulated and developed within ministerial policies. It is governed by a board of directors and is accountable to the Northern Ireland Assembly.

== History ==
The office of Director General of Electricity Supply for Northern Ireland was established in 1992 in association with the privatisation of electricity supplies in Northern Ireland. The Director General was appointed by the Department of Economic Development to regulate the electricity industry. Statutory duties included ensuring that all reasonable demands for electricity were satisfied; that licence holders were able to finance their activities; to promote competition in the generation and supply of electricity; to protect the interests of consumers of electricity in terms of price and continuity of supply; to promote efficiency and economy; to promote research and development; to protect the public from danger; and to secure the health and safety of persons employed in the generation, transmission or supply of electricity. A similar body for gas regulation, the office of Director General of Gas for Northern Ireland, was established in 1996.

The regulatory system was reformed in 2003 to combine the regulation of electricity and natural gas into a single energy regulator. The Northern Ireland Authority for Energy Regulation was established and the offices of Director General of Gas for Northern Ireland and Director General of Electricity Supply for Northern Ireland were abolished. The posts of Chief Executive and Chair of the Energy Regulator were split in 2006.

In April 2007 the regulatory system for utilities was further reformed to encompass the water supply and sewage industries. The Northern Ireland Authority for Energy Regulation became the Northern Ireland Authority for Utility Regulation. The board of directors is responsible for the overall strategic direction of the organisation. The board comprises a non-executive chairman, four non-executive members and the chief executive. The key functional areas in the organisation are Network Operations, Wholesale, Retail and Consumer Protection, and Corporate Affairs.

== Key people ==
Director General of Electricity Supply

- Geoffrey Horton, 1992–1995
- Douglas Bowman McIldoon (b. 1945), 1995–2003

Director General of Gas Supply

- Douglas Bowman McIldoon, 1996–2003

Chair and Chief Executive of Energy Regulation

- Douglas Bowman McIldoon, 2003–June 2006.

Chief Executive of Energy Regulation

- Iain Osborne, June 2006–2007

Chief Executive of Northern Ireland Authority for Utility Regulation

- Iain Osborne, 2007–December 2010
- Shane Lynch, January 2011–October 2013
- Jenny Pyper, October 2013–October 2020
- John French, November 2020–date

Chair of Northern Ireland Authority for Utility Regulation

- Prof. Peter Matthews, 2006–July 2012
- Dr. Bill Emery, July 2012–Septempber 2024
- Rosamund Blomfield-Smith, October 2024–date
