= Rostellan =

Village in County Cork, Ireland

Rostellan Ros Tialláin
- Civil parish
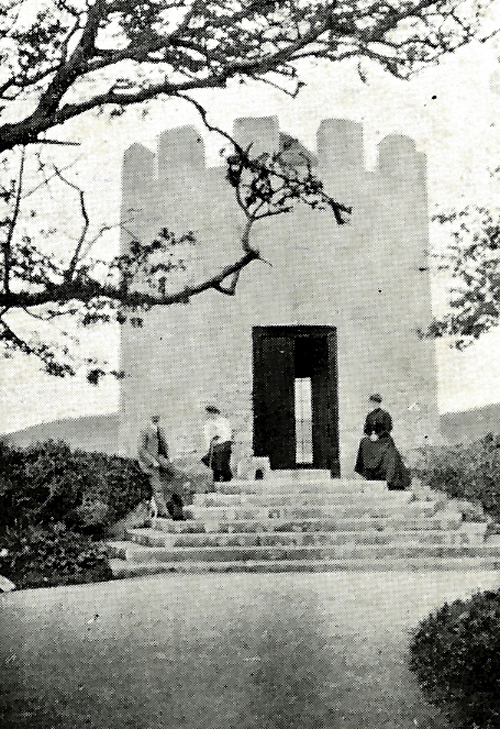
- Siddons Tower (an 18th century folly built on Rostellan Castle demesne) is now a ruin

- Location in Ireland
- Coordinates: 51°50′40″N 08°11′18″W
- Country: Ireland
- Province: Munster
- County: County Cork
- Irish grid reference: W873664

Rostellan (Irish: Ros Tialláin) is a civil parish, townland and village in the historical Barony of Imokilly, County Cork, Ireland. An electoral division of the same name forms part of the Cork East Dáil constituency. For census purposes, the village of Rostellan is combined with the neighbouring villages of Farsid and Aghada. As of the 2011 census, the combined settlement of Aghada-Farsid-Rostellan had a population of 1,015 people.

== Promontory ==
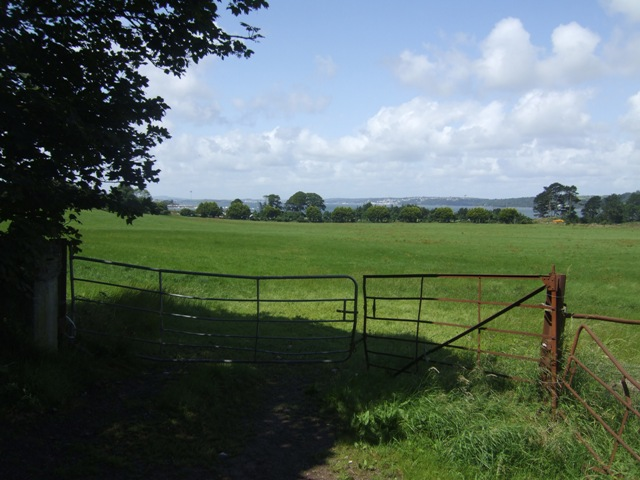
Farmland near Rostellan Wood

Rostellan Wood, a forestry amenity managed by Coillte, lies on Rostellan promontory. Rostellan Wood contains the ruins of an 18th-century folly and the remains of a megalithic portal tomb. This portal tomb, known as Rostellan Dolmen, stands in a tidal section of Saleen Creek, and comprises a large capstone and three upright stones (with two of the uprights acting as supporting orthostats to the capstone). The folly, "Siddons Tower", was built in the 1770s by Murrough O'Brien, 1st Marquess of Thomond on the grounds of his estate. O'Brien, then 5th Earl of Inchiquin, so "greatly admired" the Welsh-born English actress Sarah Siddons (who reputedly visited Rostellan) that he built and named the tower in her honour on the Rostellan Castle demesne.

Originally associated with the FitzGerald family, the O'Brien (Inchiquin) estate at Rostellan spanned the entire townland, and its manor house was Rostellan Castle. In A Topographical Dictionary of Ireland, published by Samuel Lewis in 1837, Rostellan Castle is described as an "elegant mansion", with its "highly cultivated and extensive demesne" spanning one-third of the parish. While some ruined and standing structures of the estate remain (including a large set of gates in Rostellan village), Rostellan Castle itself was demolished in 1944.

Aghada GAA club, founded in 1885, has its main sports ground on Rostellan promontory.
