= Whitegate refinery =

Oil refinery in Cork Harbour, Ireland

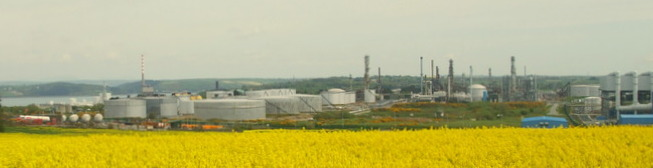
- Interactive map of Whitegate refinery
- Location: Cork, County Cork, Munster, Ireland; 51°49′08″N 08°14′51″W

Refinery details
- Operator: Irving Oil
- Owner: Irving Oil
- Opened: 1959
- Capacity: 75,000 barrels per day (11,900 m^{3}/d)
- No. of employees: 230

The Whitegate refinery, near Whitegate, County Cork, is Ireland's only oil refinery. It has a capacity of 75,000 barrels of oil per day (bpd), sufficient to provide 40 percent of Ireland's fuel requirements. It was commissioned in 1959 and was redeveloped several times and produces a range of petroleum products.

== History ==
In the late 1950s, the Government of Ireland sought to develop industry in the country. A consortium of oil companies formed the Irish Refining Company Limited to construct and operate a refinery; the participant companies and their interests were Esso (40%), Shell-Mex & BP (40%) and Caltex (20%). The refinery was constructed on a 330-acre (133 ha) site at Whitegate, East Cork, County Cork. It was built over the period 1957 to 1959 at a cost of about £12.5 million. The refinery was commissioned in April 1959 with Esso as the operator. In 1965 the refinery was expanded to increase the capacity from 1.9 million tons per year to 2.5 million tons per year, at a cost of £3 million.

In 1981, the Irish Refining Company Limited closed the refinery because of poor financial returns. The government recognised that permanent closure would have major economic and strategic consequences, and as a result, ownership was transferred to the Irish state in March 1982 through the Irish National Petroleum Corporation. The refinery was purchased by Tosco in July 2001, a company taken over by Phillips Petroleum in September 2001. Phillips merged with Conoco in September 2002 to form ConocoPhillips. In 2012, Phillips 66 assumed ownership. Irving Oil purchased the refinery in 2016.

== Plant and processes ==
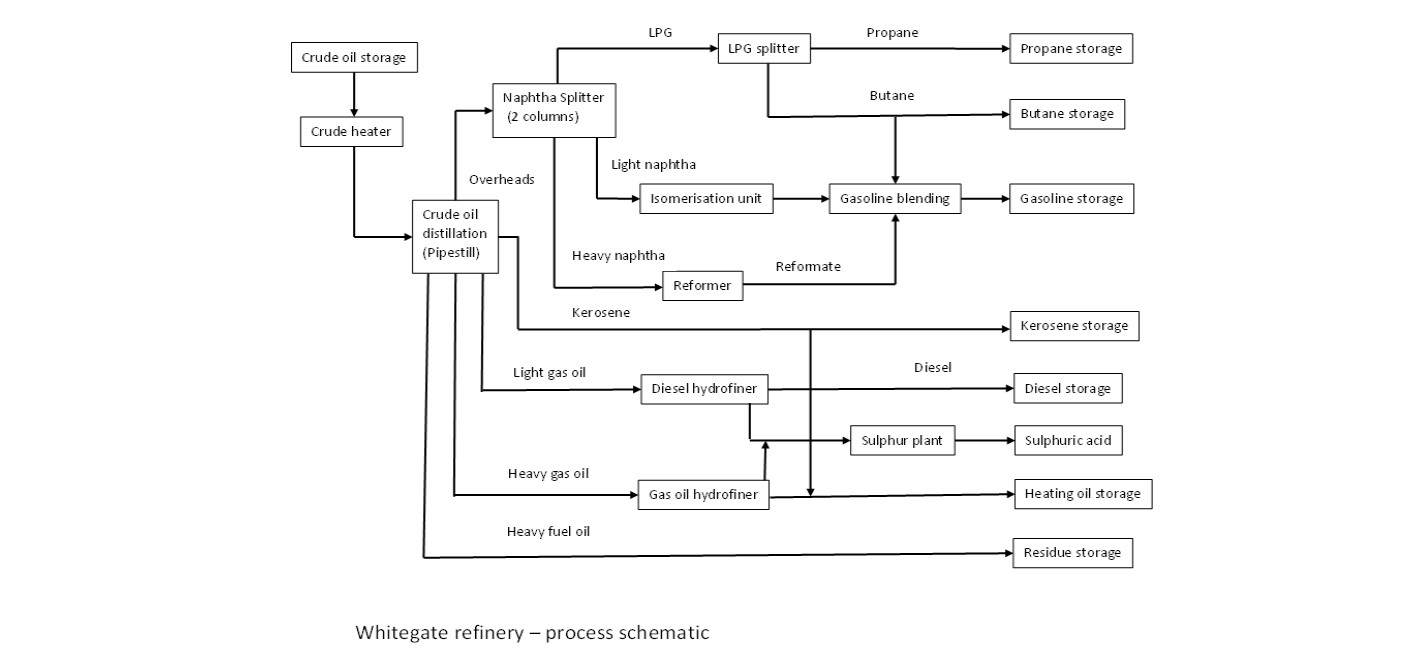
Whitegate refinery process schematic

Whitegate is a relatively simple refinery with a Nelson complexity index of 3.8. Crude oil arrives at the refinery by tanker at the Marine Terminal. This comprises two berths, Berth 1 for tankers of up to 160,000 tonnes and Berth 2 for coasters of up to 5,000 tonnes. Oil from the tankers is routed to one of seven floating roof crude oil tanks on Corkbeg Island where it is stored until required at the refinery. There are also ballast water facilities

The operation of the refinery process plant is summarised in the following table.

Whitegate refinery process units and operations
Unit	Commissioned	Capacity	Feedstock	Product
Pipestill (Crude oil distillation)		75,000 barrels per day (bpd)	Crude oil	Overheads, Kerosene, Light gas oil, Heavy gas oil Heavy fuel oil
Naphtha Splitter (two columns)	–		Pipestill overheads	Liquid petroleum gas (LPG), Light naphtha, Heavy naphtha
LPG Splitter	–		LPG	Propane, Butane
Powerformer Unit (catalytic reformer)	1958 1966	9,000 bpd 14,500 bpd	Heavy naphtha + hydrogen	Gasoline, Hydrogen rich gas
Isomerisation Unit (UOP catalytic process: converts straight chain pentane and hexane to branched isomers)	1999	6,250 bbd	Light naphtha + hydrogen	High octane blendstock
Hydrofiner Unit (desulphurisation)	1958	6,100 bpd	High sulphur diesel + hydrogen rich gas from reformer	Low sulphur Diesel, Hydrogen sulphide
Hydrofiner Unit (desulphurisation)	2007	26,000 bpd	High sulphur kerosene and gas oil + hydrogen rich gas from reformer	Low sulphur Diesel, hydrogen sulphide
Sulphur recovery Unit	1996		Hydrogen sulphide	Elemental sulphur
Amine Sulphuric Acid Plant	2011	30 tonnes / day	Hydrogen sulphide	Sulphuric Acid
Blending Plant	–		Gasoline, High octane blendstock, LPG, Methyl tert-butyl ether (MTBE), Ethanol	Grade Gasoline

The products from the refinery are stored in the adjacent tank farm until required. Petroleum blendstocks are also imported via the Marine Terminal and are routed to the blending plant. Low flash point products such as crude oil, gasolines, blendstocks, and naphtha are stored in floating roof tanks. High flash point substances such as kerosene, gasoil, diesel and heavy fuel oil are stored in cone roof tanks. Propane and butane are stored at pressure in spherical vessels.

== Utilities ==
A number of utilities support the refinery operations:

- Ballast water treatment and disposal
- Drains – including API separator
- Demineralisation plant – for boiler feedwater
- Electricity – 6.2 MW gas turbine combined heat and power plant (CHP). There are two 110 kV feeder lines from the National Grid via the adjacent Whitegate substation. Electricity can also be fed from the refinery into the National Grid.
- Steam – 13.5 tonnes per hour
- Air – plant and instrument air
- Process cooling – air coolers

== Production ==
=== Crude oil supply ===
Supply of crude oil as the refinery's main feedstock from 1990 to 2019 in thousand tonnes of oil equivalent

=== Products ===
The products from the refinery are:

- Propane
- Butane
- Gasoline
- Kerosene
- Diesel
- Heating Oil
- Heavy fuel oil
- Sulphuric acid

The production of each of the products in 2010 was:

Product	Production, barrels	Percent
LPG	390,000	2.0
Naphtha	900,000	4.6
Gasoline	3,700,000	19.0
Distillate fuel oil	7,700,000	39.5
Residual fuel oil	6,000,000	30.8
Refinery fuel	810,000	4.1
Total	19,500,000	100

Total production (in 1,000 barrels) from the refinery over the period 1994 to 2010

=== Export ===
The majority of products are exported by sea via the Marine Terminal. LPG is transferred to the adjacent Calor gas bottling plant by pipeline. The road loading facility has five bottom loading bays for exporting gasoline, gas oil and kerosene to local consumers.

The refinery was run at a loss of $22.5 million in 2020, as a result of reduced demand because of Covid. This compares to a profit of $84.7 million in 2019.

== Blockade ==
On 8 April 2026, protesters began to block the two entrances to the Irving Oil Whitegate Refinery with heavy vehicles including tractors, and lorries. This was part of the wider 2026 Irish fuel protests.

Protesters successfully blocked oil transporter trucks from entering and exiting Ireland's only oil refinery until Friday, 10 April 2026 when protesters allowed two trucks to enter the refinery to load fuel for emergency service vehicles and home heating.

On the same day, Irish Taoiseach Micheál Martin said during an interview that Ireland was on the "precipice of turning oil away from the country in the middle of a global oil supply problem" due to the blockade. He went on to say that the crude oil already refined in Whitegate could be diverted to other international markets if the blockade does not end. Due to the seriousness of the situation, that evening the Garda Commissioner declared the situation an "exceptional event" and ordered every garda in the country to work for next three days.

Shortly before 11:30 am on Saturday, 11 April 2026, four busloads of gardaí arrived at Whitegate to disperse protesters and unblock the road to allow the safe passage of trucks into the facility to remove and distribute the refined oil products around the country. Gardaí used pepper spray on protesters and convinced them to hand over the keys of their tractors and other heavy vehicles so they, the Gardaí, could move them and clear the road. The protesters eventually complied and seven oil transporter trucks entered the facility and left around 3 pm with the refined product, bringing an end to the blockade.

== Plant Review and Potential Sale ==
Irving Oil have periodically reviewed the future of the plant and may deem its disposal as an option.

== Whitegate power station ==
Adjacent to the refinery to the south (Coordinates: 51°49’07”N 08°15’17”W) is the Whitegate power station, Glanagow, County Cork. This 435 MW gas turbine station is owned by Bord Gáis part of Centrica. It is designed to run on natural gas or distillate oil, the latter from the refinery, and operates as a combined cycle gas turbine (CCGT).

== See also ==
- Oil terminals in Ireland
- Energy in Ireland
- Whitegate power station
