= Bord Gáis Energy =

Irish gas and power supplier

Bord Gáis Energy Limited
- Type: Limited company (subsidiary of Centrica)
- Industry: Utilities
- Predecessor: Bord Gáis Éireann
- Founded: 1976; 50 years ago
- Headquarters: Ireland
- Area served: Ireland
- Products: Natural gas; Electricity; Solar panel; Boiler Services
- Parent: Bord Gáis Éireann (1976–2014); Centrica (2014–present)
- Website: Official website

Bord Gáis Energy Limited (BGE) is a utility company that supplies natural gas, electricity and home energy services to customers in Ireland. BGE has been in operation in some form since 1976, and supplies over 750,000 customers with energy in Ireland. Formerly part of Bord Gáis Éireann, the vertically-integrated natural gas monopoly, since mid-2014 BGE is part of the British Centrica plc Group. BGE's offices are in Dublin and Cork, but it provides services nationwide. The Irish language "Bord Gáis" translates as "Gas Board", although it is now a private company limited by shares and part of Centrica plc, which also owns British Gas.

== History ==
Beginning in the early 2000s, Ireland's state-owned public utilities underwent major reforms, following the creation of the then-named Commission for Energy Regulation. This was part of an effort at both Irish and European level to open up electricity and gas markets and end national monopolies through the separation of customer supply and transmission within public utilities. Bord Gáis Éireann was therefore obliged to open up to competition and allow other firms access to their gas network. As part of this effort Bord Gáis Éireann was split into two main business streams Transmission and Distribution, and Energy Supply.

=== Deregulation of the Irish natural gas market ===
The European Union's Gas Directive 2009/73/EC requires that, in the case of vertically integrated utilities such as the then Bord Gáis Éireann, the Transmission System Operator (TSO) and the Distribution System Operator (DSO) functions to be legally and functionally unbundled from activities not related to these functions, although a combined DSO/TSO is permissible. Therefore, a new independent subsidiary, Gaslink, had been established to fulfil the functions of the Irish gas TSO and DSO.

=== Deregulation of the Irish electricity market ===
On 18 February 2009, Bord Gáis Energy entered the residential electricity market, joining Airtricity and ESB Customer Supply. The market had been deregulated in 2007.

=== Sale of Bord Gáis Energy ===
A condition of the EU/IMF bailout programme for Ireland, signed in 2010, required the Irish government to sell off some state-owned assets to help pay down loans and reduce Ireland's debt burden. In February 2012, the Irish government announced it would sell BGE as required under the bailout terms.

In March 2014, Bord Gáis Éireann confirmed it would sell its customer supply arm Bord Gáis Energy to a consortium made up of Centrica, Brookfield Renewable Energy and iCON Infrastructure to the value of €1.1 billion. The sale involved the splitting of the group's retail and electricity generation businesses among the three buyers. The main retail division and Whitegate power station would be bought by Centrica, while its wind assets under SWS would be acquired by Brookfield Renewable Energy Partners and iCON Infrastructure acquiring Northern Ireland-based Firmus Energy. Bord Gáis Éireann retained the infrastructure assets and was subsequently renamed Ervia.

Today, Bord Gáis Energy is a private limited company that is part of the Centrica Group, has no state authority rights and is not associated with Gas Networks Ireland other than an ordinary commercial relationship.

== Sponsorships ==
BGE has a number of sponsorship programmes including the Bord Gáis Energy Theatre,and the All Ireland GAA Senior Hurling Championship. Previous sponsorships include the Bord Gáis Energy GAA U21 All Ireland U21 Hurling Championship.,the Bord Gáis Energy Book Club Irish Book Awards, and Bord Gáis Energy Student Theatre Awards

== Services ==
In addition to supply, BGE offers a number of home energy services to customers, including gas boiler and heat pump installation and repair, solar panels, and electric vehicle charging points. Additional energy efficiency, resilience and support services are offered to business customers.

== See also ==
- Energy in Ireland
- Ervia
- United Kingdom–Ireland natural gas interconnectors
