= Celtic Sea =

Region of the Atlantic Ocean

- Other native names: An Mhuir Cheilteach (Irish); Y Môr Celtaidd (Welsh); An Mor Keltek (Cornish); Ar Mor Keltiek (Breton); Mer Celtique (French)
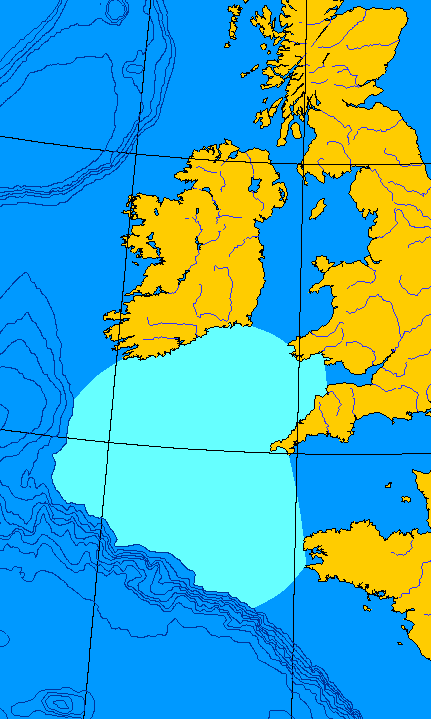
- Map of the Celtic Sea which connects the coasts of four of the Celtic nations: Ireland, Wales, Cornwall and Brittany.

- Bathymetric map of the Celtic Sea, part of the Atlantic Ocean, and its surroundings
- Location: Northwestern Europe
- Coordinates: 50°N 8°W
- Type: Sea
- Basin countries: Ireland, United Kingdom, France
- Surface area: 300,000 km^{2} (120,000 sq mi)

The Celtic Sea (Note: Irish: An Mhuir Cheilteach [ənˠ wɪrʲ ˈçɛlʲtʲax]; Welsh: Y Môr Celtaidd [ə moːr ˈkɛltaið]; Cornish: An Mor Keltek [an mɔːr ˈkɛltɛk]; Breton: Ar Mor Keltiek [ar moːr kɛlˈtiːɛk]; French: Mer Celtique [mɛʁ sɛltik]) is the area of the Atlantic Ocean off the southern coast of Ireland bounded to the north by Saint George's Channel; other limits include the Bristol Channel, the English Channel, and the Bay of Biscay, as well as adjacent portions of Wales, Cornwall, parts of Devon and Brittany. The continental shelf, which drops away sharply, delimits the southern and western boundaries. The Iroise Sea off Brittany is entirely included within it. The Isles of Scilly are an archipelago of small islands in the sea.

== History ==
The Celtic Sea receives its name from the Celtic heritage of the bounding lands to the north and east. E. W. L. Holt proposed the name at a 1921 meeting of fisheries experts from Great Britain, France, and the Republic of Ireland in Dublin. This sea's northern portion was considered part of Saint George's Channel, and the southern portion was an undifferentiated part of the Southwest Approaches to Great Britain. The desire for a common name came to be felt because of the area's common marine biology, geology and hydrology.

It was adopted in France before being common in English-speaking countries. In 1957, Édouard Le Danois wrote, "the name Celtic Sea is hardly known even to oceanographers." Marine biologists and oceanographers adopted it, and later, by petroleum exploration firms. It is named in a 1963 British atlas, but a 1972 article states, "what British maps call the Western Approaches, and what the oil industry calls the Celtic Sea [...] certainly the residents on the western coast [of Great Britain] don't refer to it as such."

== Seabed ==
The seabed under the Celtic Sea is referred to as the Celtic Shelf, part of the continental shelf of Europe. The northeast portion has a depth of between 90 and 100 m (300–330 ft), increasing towards Saint George's Channel. In the opposite direction, sand ridges pointing southwest have a similar height, separated by troughs approximately 50 m (160 ft) deeper. These ridges were formed by tidal effects when the sea level was lower. South of 50°N, the topography is more irregular.

Oil and gas exploration in the Celtic Sea has had limited commercial success. The Kinsale Head gas field supplied much of Ireland's demand for gas in the 1980s and 1990s. The water is too deep for fixed wind turbines. The area has potential for 50 GW of floating wind farms, and TotalEnergies plans a project with almost 100 MW.

== Ecology ==
The Celtic Sea has a rich fishery with total annual catches of 1.8 million tonnes as of 2007.

Four cetacean species occur frequently: minke whale, bottlenose dolphin, short-beaked common dolphin and harbor porpoise. Formerly, it held an abundance of marine mammals.

== Limits ==
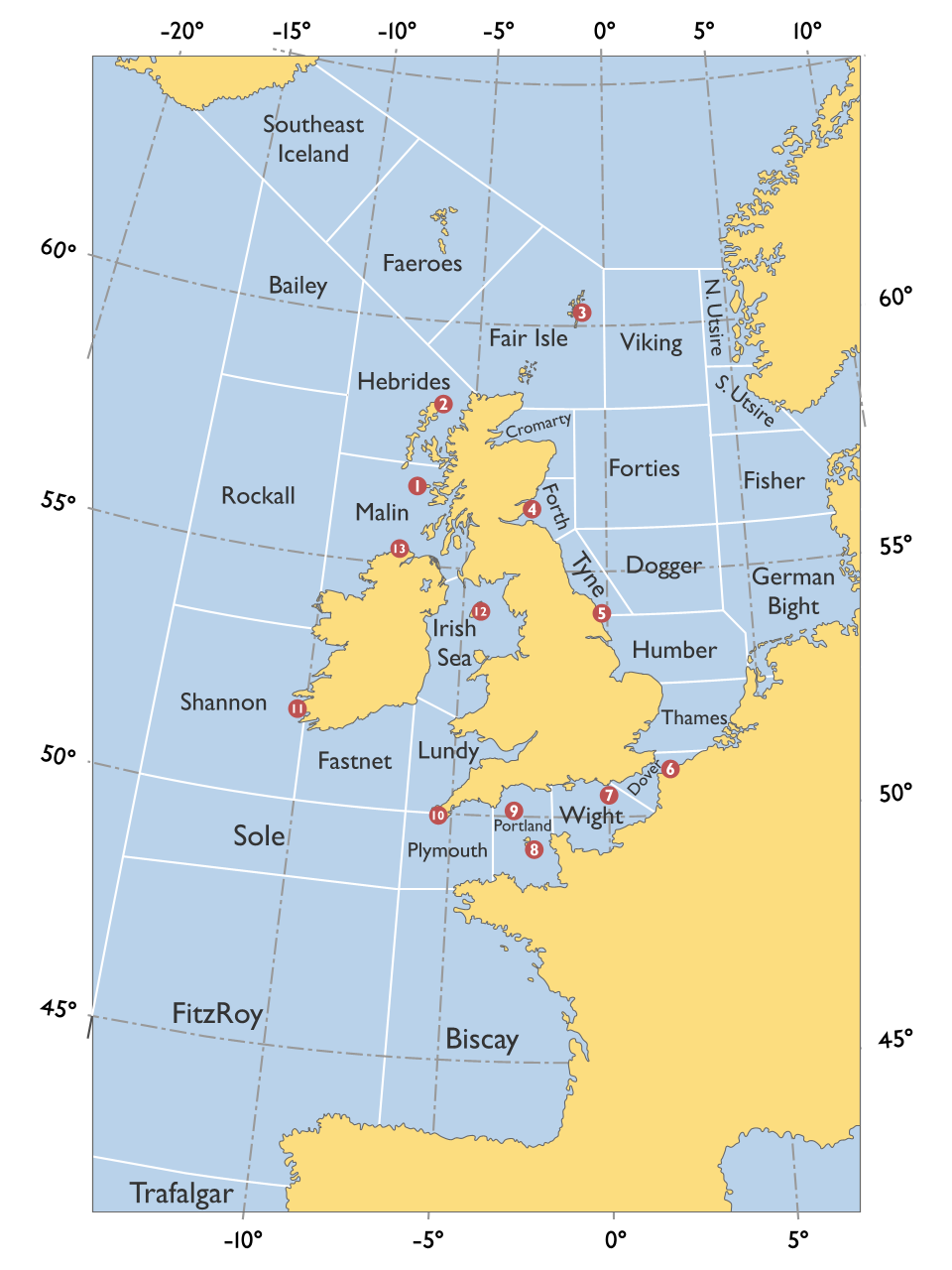
Map of Sea Areas referred to in the Shipping Forecast; Lundy is in the Celtic Sea.

There are no land features to divide the Celtic Sea from the open Atlantic Ocean to the south and west. For these limits, Holt suggested the 200-fathom (370 m; 1,200 ft) marine contour and the island of Ushant off the tip of Brittany.

The definition approved in 1974 by the UK Hydrographer of the Navy for use in British Admiralty Charts was "bounded roughly by lines joining Ushant, Land's End, Hartland Point, Lundy Island, St. Govan's Head and Rosslare, thence following the Irish coast south to Mizen Head and then along the 200-metre isobath to approximately the latitude of Ushant."

The International Hydrographic Organization defines the limits of the Celtic Sea as follows:

On the North. The Southern limit of the Irish Sea [a line joining St David's Head to Carnsore Point], the South coast of Ireland, thence from Mizen Head a line drawn to a position 51°0′N 11°30′W.

On the West and South. A line from the position 51°0′N 11°30′W South to 49°N, thence to latitude 46°30'N on the Western limit of the Bay of Biscay [a line joining Cape Ortegal to Penmarch Point], thence along that line to Penmarch Point.

On the East. The Western limit of the English Channel [a line joining Île Vierge to Land's End] and the Western limit of the Bristol Channel [a line joining Hartland Point to St. Govan's Head].

== See also ==
- Irish Conservation Box
