= Saleen, County Cork =

Village in County Cork, Ireland

Saleen Sáilín
- Village
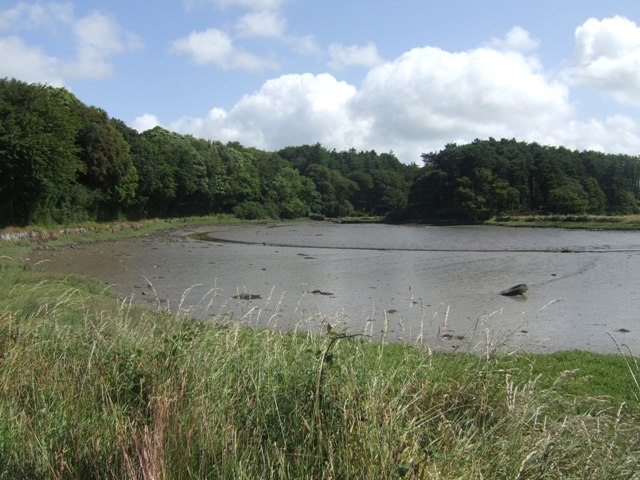
- Saleen Creek opens to Cork Harbour and is southwest of Saleen village

- Location in Ireland
- Coordinates: 51.8636°N 8.1637°W
- Country: Ireland
- Province: Munster
- County: Cork

Population (2016)
  - Total: 445
- Irish Grid Reference: W887679

Saleen (Irish: Sáilín) is a small village and census town in County Cork, Ireland. It is located in the civil parish of Garranekinnefeake, in the Cork County Council municipal district of East Cork. Saleen lies on the R630 regional road between Midleton and Whitegate.

Evidence of ancient settlement in the area includes a megalithic portal tomb in Saleen Creek near Rostellan, and ringfort sites in the neighbouring townlands of Scartlea Lower and Jamesbrook. The local church, the Church of the Mother of God, is in the Roman Catholic Diocese of Cloyne and is dated to c. 1801. It is listed on Cork County Council's Record of Protected Structures.

At the start of the 2020 school year, Saleen's national (primary) school had an enrollment of over 450 pupils. The village had a population of 445 as of the 2016 census, up from 374 as of the 2011 census.
