= Providence Resources =

Irish oil and gas company

- Traded as: AIM: PVR; Euronext: PZQA
- Headquarters: Airfield Park, Donnybrook, Dublin, Ireland
- Key people: Alan Lynn (CEO)
- Website: www.providenceresources.com

Providence Resources is an Irish oil and gas exploration company. It is listed on the London Stock Exchange and the Irish Stock Exchange. Its primary activities are the exploration and development of hydrocarbons offshore Ireland and the United Kingdom.

The predecessor to Providence, Atlantic Resources, was formed in 1981 by a group led by Tony O'Reilly. Tony O'Reilly, Junior was CEO of Providence from 2005 to 2019.

== Projects ==
Providence drilled Ireland's first commercially viable oil well at the Barryroe field in 2012. The exploratory well far exceeded expectations with an initial flow rate of 3,500 bpd. Barryroe is situated approximately 50 km south of the County Cork coast at a 100m water depth and an independent audit in April 2013 estimated that Barryroe holds in excess of 1.6 billion barrels of oil, of which 346 million barrels equivalent is recoverable. As of 2020, company is still appraising the field and is seeking farmout partners to begin development.

In 2015, Providence planned to drill an appraisal well at Spanish Point of the west Irish coast along with partners Cairn Energy (38%), Chrysaor (26%) and Sosina (4%). Drilling was delayed to 2017 and then to an indefinite time later, subject to the licence being extended to allow this.

In 2016 Providence announced a plan to drill at the Druid and Drombeg prospects south-west of Ireland, and in contracting a drilling operation to begin in June 2017. The 2017 Druid well contained only water.

Providence is a partner (26.8% stake) in the Dunquin oil field in the Porcupine Basin, along with operator Eni, Repsol, and Sosina. ExxonMobil was previously a major partner and operator but exited the project after drilling an unsuccessful well at Dunquin North in 2013.
