= Turlough Hill Power Station =

Hydroelectric station in Wicklow, Ireland

Turlough Hill Pumped-Storage Scheme
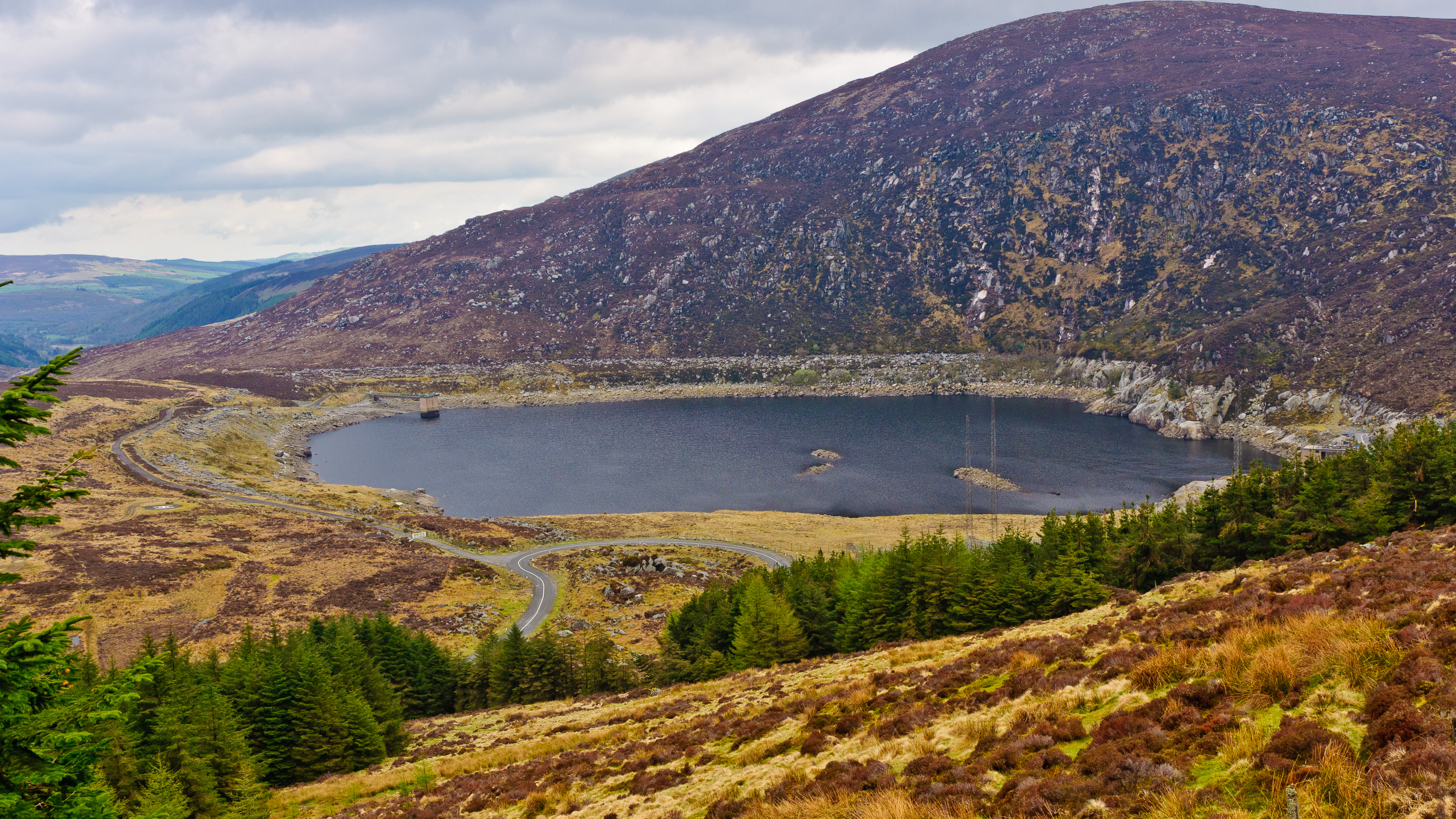
- Lough Nahanagan, the lower reservoir

- Location within Ireland
- Coordinates: 53°01′43″N 6°24′23″W
- Purpose: Power
- Status: Operational
- Construction began: 1968 (58 years ago)
- Opening date: 1974 (52 years ago)
- Construction cost: IEP £22 million
- Owner: ESB Group

Upper reservoir
- Creates: Turlough Hill
- Total capacity: 2,300,000 cubic metres (81,000,000 cu ft)
- Surface area: 160,000 square metres (1,700,000 sq ft)
- Maximum water depth: 19.4 metres (64 ft)

Lower reservoir
- Creates: Lough Nahanagan

Power Station
- Type: Pumped-storage
- Hydraulic head: 286 metres (937.5 ft)
- Pump-generators: 4 x 73 MW (98,000 hp)
- Installed capacity: 292 MW (392,000 hp)
- Overall efficiency: 75%
- Storage capacity: 5+ hours (1.59 GigaWatt-Hours)
- Website www.esb.ie/our-businesses/generation-energy-trading-new/generation-asset-map#turlough-hill

The Turlough Hill Power Station is a pumped storage power station in Ireland, owned and operated by the Electricity Supply Board (ESB).

Like all pumped-storage hydroelectric schemes, it makes use of two water reservoirs connected by a pressure tunnel: in this case an artificial reservoir near the summit of the mountain and the naturally occurring corrie lake, Lough Nahanagan, at the foot of the mountain. Water is pumped up from the lower reservoir to the upper reservoir, using surplus power available at times of low demand, and then allowed to fall by gravity from the upper reservoir back into the lower reservoir, passing through turbines along the way to generate electricity. The generating plant resides inside the mountain in a cavern measuring 250×70×90 feet (76×21×27 metres), which houses four reversible pump turbines with a combined capacity of 292 megawatts. The upper reservoir is 19.4 metres (64 feet) deep, has a capacity of 2.3 million cubic metres (81 million cubic feet) and covers an area of 160,000 square metres (40 acres). The power station is designed to generate electricity at times of peak demand and is instantly dispatchable: it can go from standstill to full generation within 70 seconds, compared with 12 hours for some thermal plants. It can generate electricity at full load for up to six hours per day and has a round trip energy efficiency of 75%. Since 2004, Turlough Hill has been the Hydro Control Centre (HCC) for the entire ESB hydroelectric portfolio, which comprises 19 generators in total. An overhaul of the plant was planned for 2011 following the failure of Unit 1's stator bars. A subsequent investigation led to serious defects being discovered, which led to the refurbishment of all four generating units.

== History ==
Turlough Hill was first conceived by Dermot O'Riordan, Deputy Chief Engineer in the ESB's Civil Engineering Department. In 1964, ESB engineers visited several locations in the Wicklow Mountains, digging trial pits and boreholes, looking for suitable sites for a pumped-storage station. A shortlist of three proposals was drawn up by O'Riordan: an artificial upper reservoir at the summit of Tonduff mountain with an artificial lower reservoir in the Glencree valley; an upper reservoir using Lough Ouler, a natural corrie lake near the summit of Tonelagee mountain, with an artificial lower reservoir in the Glenmacnass valley; and an artificial upper reservoir at Turlough Hill with Lough Nahanagan as lower reservoir.

The Turlough Hill site was chosen as the best of these options and work commenced on the scheme in 1968. The cost was estimated at IEP £12 million. A loan of £6 million was secured from the World Bank to partially finance the project. Contracts worth £2 million were signed with Karlstad Mekaniska Werkstad for four reversible pump turbines and with Siemens for four 73 megawatt generators in 1969. The contracts for the civil engineering works were awarded to two German consortia: Beuscher-Teerbau for the upper reservoir and Alfred Kunz & Co. for the underground works in the lower reservoir.

Concerns about the impact of the scheme on the scenery at the Wicklow Gap led to ESB, whose chairman and chief executive at the time, Tom Murray, was an enthusiastic supporter of the project, engaging the services of landscape architect Sylvia Crowe. She recommended that the upper reservoir be camouflaged by planting vegetation on its embankments and that the works on the lower reservoir at Lough Nahanagan be designed to fit into the background of rock. The siting of the transmission lines that would connect Turlough Hill to the electrical grid was a matter of some controversy. Objections to the lines, planned to run from Turlough Hill to the village of Hollywood, came from several quarters, including Bord Fáilte, the Irish tourist board. In the end, it was decided that they would run underground from Turlough Hill for c. 1 mile (1.6 kilometres), to preserve the view at the Wicklow Gap, before emerging overground on pylons along the King's River to Hollywood. This added £600,000 to the cost of the project.

At their peak, the construction works employed over 500 personnel: many of the workers lived in a temporary camp adjacent to the site, which provided food and lodgings. During the initial exploratory works, a geological fault was discovered inside the mountain and the location of the cavern housing the generating plant had to be altered. 1,400 pounds (640 kilograms) of gelignite were stolen from the site in an armed raid in 1972. Archaeological investigations near the Wicklow Gap during construction uncovered part of Saint Kevin's Road, the ancient path that brought pilgrims from Hollywood to the monastery at Glendalough. The first generator went on line in December 1973 and remaining three soon followed. The scheme became fully operational in 1974. At the time of completion, it was the largest civil engineering project ever carried out in Ireland. The final cost of the project was IEP £22 million.

Following the completion of Turlough Hill, the ESB considered a number of sites – in the Wicklow and Comeragh mountains as well as around Lough Derg – for further pumped-storage schemes. However, Turlough Hill remains the only such scheme in Ireland to date, although the Commission for Energy Regulation has approved the construction of a 70MW facility at Knocknagreenan, County Cork.

== Name ==
Before construction of the pumped-storage scheme, the hill overlooking Lough Nahanagan was not named on the Ordnance Survey map. J. O'Riordan, the ESB engineer who carried out the original survey and recommended the site, named the hill after his son, Turlough. The similarity between the name and the Irish term turlough, meaning a dry lake, was coincidental.

== Energy characteristics ==
The Irish Minister for Communications, Energy and Natural Resources reported to the Oireachtas on 15 January 2014 "... in Ireland we have the Turlough Hill pumped storage facility in County Wicklow, which has a capacity of 292 MW. With the upper reservoir full, there is an energy storage of 1,590 megawatt-hours which equates to more than 5 hours running of the station at full output."

== See also ==
- Electricity sector in Ireland
