= Moneypoint power station =

Electricity generating station in Ireland

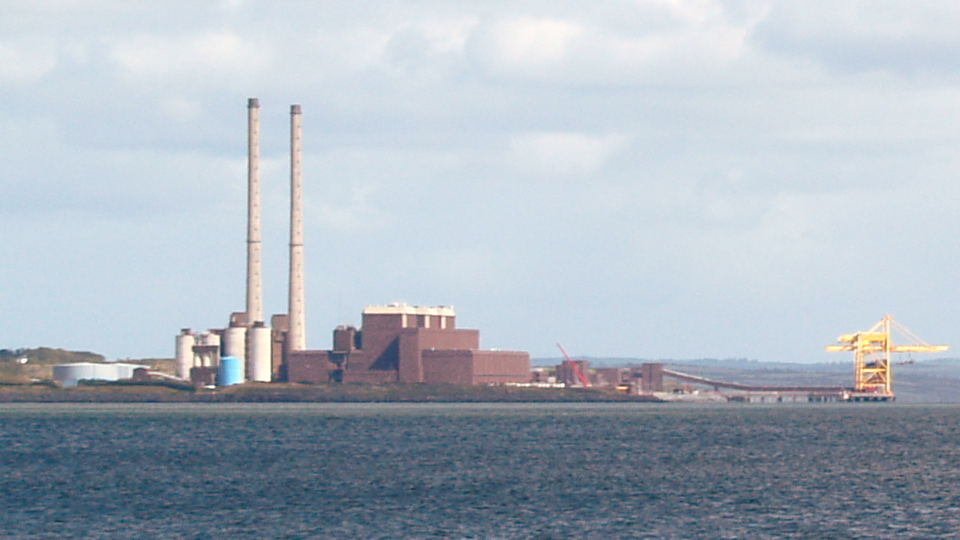
- Moneypoint Power Station as seen from County Kerry
- Country: Ireland
- Location: County Clare
- Coordinates: 52°36′27″N 9°25′27″W
- Status: Operational
- Commission date: September 1985
- Owner: ESB Group

Thermal power station
- Primary fuel: Coal
- Secondary fuel: Fuel oil
- Turbine technology: Steam turbine
- Site area: 170 ha (420 acres)
- Chimneys: 2

Power generation
- Units operational: 3 × 305 MW
- Make and model: Foster Wheeler (3)
- Nameplate capacity: 915 MW

External links
- Commons: Related media on Commons

Moneypoint power station (Irish: Stáisiún cumhachta Ghob na Muine) is a large power station in Ireland which ceased to be a coal-fired power station in June 2025. After ceasing burning coal, it is to operate as a "back-up out-of-market generator" using heavy oil for electricity generation until 2029. The facility also operates a flywheel synchronous condenser providing grid-stabilization services.

For a period, Moneypoint was Ireland's largest electricity generation station (with an output 915 MW), and its only coal-fired plant. Commissioned between 1985 and 1987, it is located on the River Shannon, near Kilrush in County Clare, and was constructed at a cost of more than £700m. The station originally operated largely on coal, making it both unique in the context of Irish electricity production and for a while was the country's single largest emitter of greenhouse gases. At its peak, it was capable of meeting around 25% of customer demand across the country but by 2023, coal's share of the electricity fuel mix in Ireland had fallen to 4%.

When operating as a coal-fired power station, it had three Brown Boveri four-cylinder, single-shaft impulse reaction turbines which were directly connected to three electric generators. The steam was generated by three Foster Wheeler two-pass boilers, which converted water into high pressure steam by combustion of the coal.

The power station chimneys, at 218m, are the tallest free-standing structures in Ireland.

== History ==
Moneypoint was under construction from 1979 to 1987. Before its construction, Ireland depended heavily on imported oil for its energy. During the 1970s, a sharp increase in oil prices over a short period of time led the government and the Electricity Supply Board to choose coal as a fuel, as it was seen as a plentiful resource with a stable price.

In 2019, the government launched its climate action plan which included a commitment to end the burning of coal in Moneypoint by 2025, and replace coal-fired generation with "low-carbon and renewable technologies". As of 2021, one option being explored was a 400 MW floating wind farm with an onshore hydrogen facility. A plan was announced in April 2021 by its owner, the ESB Group, to replace the facility with a green-energy hub.

In 2023, it was reported that the plant would continue operations until 2029 as an oil-burning back-up facility of last resort. By 2024, the ESB Group had been granted permission to convert the facility for use as a Heavy Fuel Oil (HFO) generator. It has two HFO storage tanks with a capacity of 50,000 tonnes.

In June 2025, coal-burning ceased at Moneypoint.

== See also ==
- Shannon hydroelectric scheme
