= Whitegate, County Cork =

Village on Cork Harbour, Ireland

Whitegate An Geata Bán (Irish)
- Village
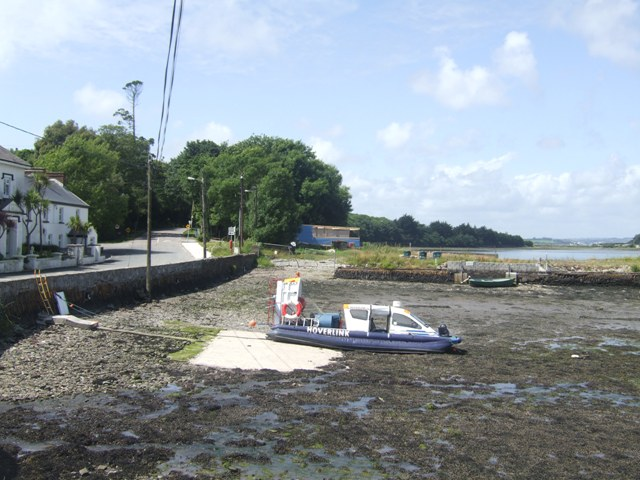
- Whitegate waterfront at low tide

- Location in Ireland
- Coordinates: 51.8262°N 8.2322°W
- Country: Ireland
- Province: Munster
- County: County Cork
- Dáil constituency: Cork East
- EU Parliament: South

Population (2022)
  - Total: 1,248
- Time zone: UTC+0 (WET)
  - Summer (DST): UTC-1 (IST (WEST))

Whitegate (Irish: an Geata Bán) is a small village in East Cork on the eastern shore of Cork Harbour in County Cork, Ireland. It lies within the townlands of Ballincarroonig and Corkbeg. Whitegate is within the Cork East Dáil constituency.

The ruins of a 14th-century or 15th-century church lie in the grounds of Corkbeg churchyard close to Whitegate village. The current Church of Ireland parish church was built within the same churchyard in 1881.

Once a fishing port and known for lace-making, during the 20th-century Whitegate became the location for Ireland's only oil refinery. This facility, Whitegate refinery, was built on Corkbeg Island on one side of Whitegate Bay and has been owned by Irving Oil since 2016. Aghada Power Generating plant lies on the other side of the bay.

The writer William Wall grew up here, though his home, then vacant, was destroyed in a fire in 2008 in a suspected arson attack. Trabolgan Holiday Village is located nearby.

== Historic estates ==
The Hiberno-Norman FitzGerald family (a sub-branch of the Desmond Geraldines that owned Corkbeg and Lisquinlan), were landowners in the area. Following a marriage between the FitzGerald and Uniacke families, ownership of lands at Corkbeg and Whitegate transferred to Col Robert Uniacke. After marrying Helena FitzGerald, Robert Uniacke assumed the name and arms of the FitzGeralds. Ultimately Uniacke Fitzgerald's nephew, another Col Robert Uniacke Fitzgerald, built a great house on the estate lands. The Corkbeg and Lisquinlan estates were later willed to Sir Robert Uniacke-Penrose-FitzGerald 1st Bt of Corkbeg and Lisquinlan who died 1919 without issue. Whitegate House, dating from c.1780, still stands at Whitegate.

== See also ==
- List of towns and villages in Ireland
