= Larne Lough =

Inlet on the coast of Northern Ireland

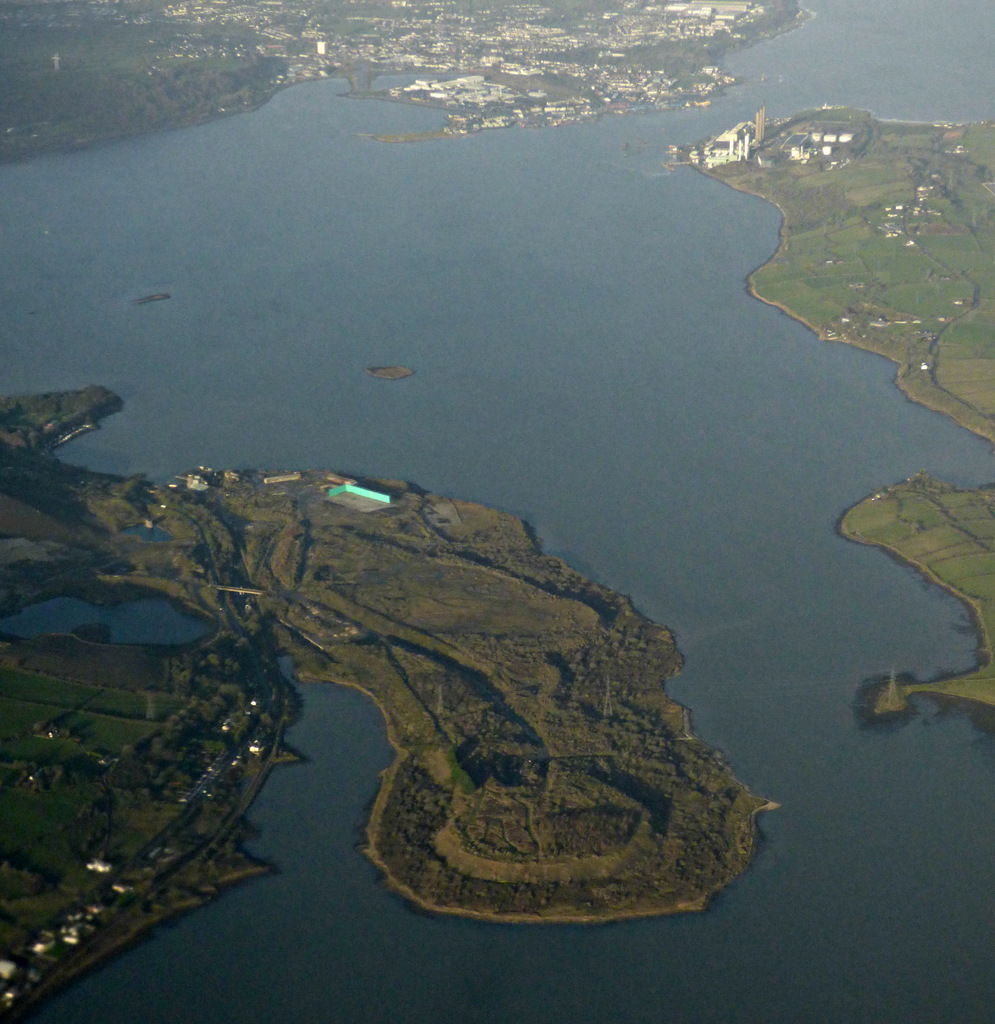
- Larne Lough from the air, with Magheramorne in the foreground and Larne and Ballylumford in the background

- Location of Larne Lough
- Location: Larne, County Antrim, Northern Ireland
- Coordinates: 54.82762°N 5.79011°W
- Basin countries: Northern Ireland

Ramsar Wetland
- Designated: 4 March 1997
- Reference no.: 895

Larne Lough, historically Lough Larne (from Irish Loch Latharna), is a sea loch or inlet in County Antrim, Northern Ireland. It lies between the Islandmagee peninsula and the mainland. At its mouth is the town of Larne. It is designated as an area of special scientific interest, a special protection area, and a Ramsar site to protect the wetland environment, particularly due to the presence of certain bird species and shellfish.

== Name ==
The lough takes its name from the small medieval territory of Latharna meaning "descendants of Lathair". The older name for the lough was Loch Ollarbha or Inbhear nOllarbha, from Ollarbha, the ancient name of the Larne Water.

== Places of interest ==
Chaine Memorial Tower lighthouse is on the west side of the entrance to Larne Lough.

== Flora and fauna ==
In 1929, a "Coastal Survey" of the algae of the north-east of Ireland was begun when a few members of the Botanical Society in The Queen's University of Belfast investigated and mapped the distribution of the seaweeds. Among the algae recorded was Ascophyllum nodosum var. minor Turn. The northern end was also surveyed.

== Railway line ==
The Belfast-Larne railway line brings the line alongside the shore line from Larne Harbour, Larne Town, Glynn, Magheramorne, and Ballycarry, over the section of land linking Islandmagee to Whitehead railway station then running alongside Belfast Lough via Carrickfergus and Belfast Lanyon Place to Belfast Grand Central

== See also ==
- List of loughs in Ireland
- List of Ramsar sites in Northern Ireland
