= Economy of Northern Ireland =

- Belfast City Hall
- Currency: Pound sterling (£)
- Fiscal year: 1 April to 31 March (Note: 6 – 5 April for personal tax)

Statistics
- Population: 1,927,855 (2024)
- GDP: £63.3 billion (2023)
- GDP per capita: £32,944 (2023)
- Labour force: 897,000 / 71.6% in employment (Jan–Mar 2025) (Note: In employment and aged 16 or over (quantity) or aged 16–64 (percent))
- Labour force by occupation: List: 23.9% Professional; 11.8% Skilled trades; 11.7% Administrative and secretarial; 10.5% Associate professional; 10.1% Caring, leisure and other service; 8.9% Elementary occupations; 8.4% Sales and customer service; 8.0% Managers, directors and senior officials; 6.2% Process plant and machine operatives; (Jan–Dec 2024) (Note: Percent is a proportion of all persons in employment aged 16 and over)
- Unemployment: 14,000 / 1.6% (Jan–Mar 2025) (Note: Unemployed aged 16 and over. Percent is a proportion of economically active.)
- Average gross salary: £670.80 per week (2024) (Note: Median gross weekly pay for full time employees resident in Northern Ireland)

External
- Exports: £13.2 billion (2021) (Note: Goods and services)
- Export goods: List: £2.6bn Machinery and transport; £1.4bn Food and live animals; £1.1bn Chemicals; £0.9bn Miscellaneous manufactures; £0.9bn Manufactured goods; £0.4bn Beverages and tobacco; £0.4bn Mineral fuels; £0.3bn Crude materials; £0.1bn Animal and vegetable oils; £0.0bn Other commodities; £8.0bn Total; (2021) (Note: Excluding services)
- Main export partners: List: £5.1bn European Union; £1.3bn North America; £0.9bn Asia & Oceania; £0.2bn Middle East and North Africa (excl. EU); £0.1bn Western Europe (excl. EU); £0.1bn Sub-Saharan Africa; £0.1bn Latin America and Caribbean; £0.1bn Eastern Europe (excl. EU); — Undefined country group; £8.0bn Total; (2021)
- Imports: £11.0 billion (2021)
- Import goods: List: £1.8bn Machinery and transport; £1.4bn Food and live animals; £1.4bn Manufactured goods; £1.3bn Chemicals; £1.1bn Miscellaneous manufactures; £0.4bn Crude materials; £0.3bn Mineral fuels; £0.2bn Beverages and tobacco; £0.1bn Animal and vegetable oils; £0.0bn Other commodities; £7.9bn Total; (2021)
- Main import partners: List: £5.3bn European Union; £1.4bn Asia & Oceania; £0.6bn North America; £0.3bn Western Europe (excl. EU); £0.1bn Latin America and Caribbean; £0.1bn Eastern Europe (excl. EU); £0.1bn Middle East and North Africa (excl. EU); £0.0bn Sub-Saharan Africa; — Undefined country group; £7.9bn Total; (2021)

The economy of Northern Ireland is the smallest of the four constituents of the United Kingdom and the smaller of the two jurisdictions on the island of Ireland. At the time of the Partition of Ireland in 1922, and for a period afterwards, Northern Ireland had a predominantly industrial economy, most notably in shipbuilding, rope manufacture and textiles, but most heavy industry has since been replaced by services. Northern Ireland's economy has strong links to the economies of the Republic of Ireland and Great Britain.

== Overview ==
=== Output and economic growth ===
In 2023, Northern Ireland had the smallest economy of any of the twelve ITL 1 regions of the United Kingdom, at £63.3 billion; this is partly because Northern Ireland has the smallest population. Northern Ireland's GDP per capita stood at £32,944 in 2023, exceeding that of both North East England (£28,583) and Wales (£29,316). Northern Ireland also experienced the largest increase in real GDP of any ITL 1 region in 2023, at 2.1%.

Rural areas including the North West are particularly deprived. It suffers from the highest unemployment and highest poverty rates in Northern Ireland.

Throughout the 1990s, the Northern Irish economy grew faster than the rest of the UK, due in part to the rapid growth of the economy of the Republic of Ireland and the so-called "peace dividend". An April 2007 survey found Northern Ireland's average house price to be one of the highest in the UK, behind London, the South East, and the South West. It also found Northern Ireland to have all of the top ten property "hot spots", with the Craigavon and Newtownards areas increasing by 55%. However, as of 2018, Northern Ireland house prices are the lowest on average in the UK, approximately 40% lower than before the bubble burst in 2008.

=== Employment ===
Unemployment in Northern Ireland has fallen substantially in recent years, and in early 2024, it was at 2.1%. In 2024, working-age economic inactivity is 26.7%. Youth unemployment and long-term unemployment have fallen most quickly.

Northern Ireland's macroeconomy is also characterised by considerably longer actual working hours and lower gender income disparity than in the United Kingdom as a whole.

=== Challenges in the 2020s ===
The Northern Ireland economy has been adversely affected by Brexit, COVID-19 and the collapse of Stormont.

==== Brexit ====
The Northern Ireland Protocol created a de facto customs border in the Irish Sea between Northern Ireland and Great Britain, leading to major changes in imports and exports.

==== Effects of the COVID-19 pandemic ====
The economy of Northern Ireland was negatively impacted by the lockdowns and travel restrictions necessitated by the COVID-19 pandemic. The tourism and hospitality industry was particularly hard hit. These sectors "have been mandated to close since 26 December 2020, with a very limited number of exceptions" and many restrictions were continuing into April 2021. Hotels and other accommodations, for example, "closed apart from only for work-related stays". Restaurants and pubs were restricted to take-away service. In February 2021, the government said it would not consider "reopening hospitality before mid-summer".

In late March, owners and operators of many types of businesses signed a petition "calling for the economy to reopen" and requested a "proper timetable plan" for rebuilding the economy. The content also discussed the "catastrophe" that the lockdowns and restrictions had created. Government assistance was available; the £25,000 Retail, Hospitality, Tourism and Leisure Grant was closed by 25 March 2021 but "a further payment" was to be made to eligible businesses.

Some restrictions were expected to be loosened in mid April but tourism was expected to remain very limited. Anyone entering NI and planning to stay for a day or longer was required to "self-isolate for 10 days"; this did not apply to those on "essential" trips. Everyone entering NI was required to provide evidence of a negative COVID-19 test.

Restrictions were fully relaxed after two years in February 2022.

==== The collapse of Stormont ====
Stormont has been collapsed on six occasions in 25 years, most recently from February 2022 to February 2024. This has led to instability in the economy.

== Investment ==
Foreign direct investment was restrained by The Troubles; however, since the signing of the Good Friday Agreement, investment in Northern Ireland has increased significantly. Most investment has been focused in Greater Belfast and to a lesser extent Greater Derry. Major projects have included the Victoria Square Shopping Centre Belfast City Centre and Titanic Quarter waterfront development. The Laganside Corporation was previously at the forefront of the redevelopment along the banks of the River Lagan. The Cathedral Quarter has also seen substantial investment. In Derry, the ILEX Urban Regeneration Company no longer exists. The area is 12th in terms of funding despite it being the second city.

In 2024, key industries in Northern Ireland include aerospace, agriculture, construction, engineering, health technology, manufacturing, services and tourism. Finance and creative digital areas are also strong in Belfast.

== Agriculture ==
Agriculture in Northern Ireland is heavily mechanised. In 2000, agriculture accounted for 2.4% of economic output in Northern Ireland, compared to 1% in the United Kingdom as a whole. As in the rest of the United Kingdom, livestock and dairy account for the majority of agricultural output. The main crops are potatoes, barley, and wheat.

By 2021, Northern Ireland was self-sufficient in food production and was able to export more than half of its meat and crops to the rest of the UK and beyond.

== Manufacturing ==
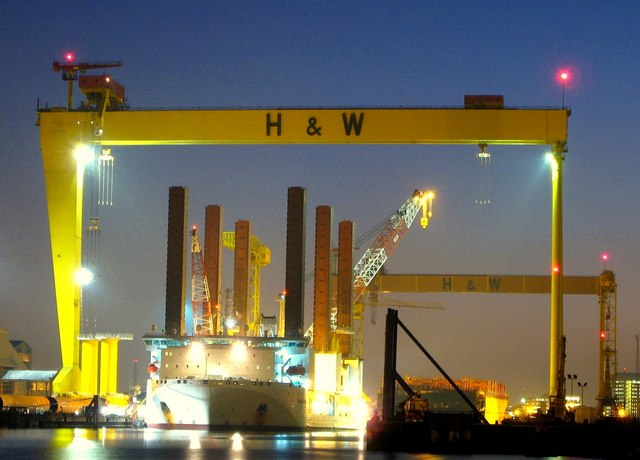
Harland and Wolff cranes in Belfast

Machinery and equipment manufacturing, food processing, textile and electronics manufacturing are the leading industries. Other industries such as papermaking, furniture manufacturing, aerospace and shipbuilding are also important, concentrated mostly in the eastern parts of Northern Ireland.

Northern Ireland experienced a period of steep manufacturing growth between 1998 and 2001.

Engineering is the largest manufacturing sub-sector in Northern Ireland, particularly in the fields of aerospace and heavy machinery. Major employers are Moy Park, Spirit AeroSystems, Caterpillar and Seagate.

Harland and Wolff, which in the early 20th century was the world's biggest shipbuilder, suffered from intense international competition during the 1970s and 1980s and declined rapidly. During the 1990s the company diversified into civil engineering and industrial fabrication, manufacturing bridges and oil platforms. The vast works on Queen's Island were downsized, with much of the land (including the slipway where RMS Titanic was built) sold off for redevelopment in the 2000s as the Titanic Quarter. In April 2023, the Belfast shipyard completed its first new vessel in over twenty years, a barge for the waste management company Cory. The company was also awarded a £1.6 billion contract to deliver three naval support ships for the Royal Fleet Auxiliary as part of the Team Resolute consortium. However, in September 2024, Harland & Wolff Group Holdings PLC entered administration after the company failed to secure long-term financing. between 50 and 60 immediate redundancies were announced, while staff at the four operational shipyards were not affected. In January 2025, Spanish state-owned shipbuilder Navantia UK completed the acquisition of Harland & Wolff's facilities in Belfast, Appledore, Methil and Arnish, protecting more than 1,000 jobs across the four sites.

== Services ==
Services account for almost 70% of economic output, and 78% of employees.

In the third quarter of 2024, a majority of economic growth came from the service sector.

== Public sector ==
In 1992 the public sector accounted for 37% of the workforce.

In December 2008 the public sector in Northern Ireland accounted for 30.8% of the total workforce; this is significantly higher than the overall UK figure.

By 2022, the public sector accounted for 27% of NI jobs, compared to 18% across the UK.

In total in 2006, the British government subvention totalled £5,000m, or 20% of Northern Ireland's economic output. This had risen to £11,547m in 2009–10 during the "Great Recession", and then fell back to £9,160m in 2013–14. A 2017 article by a research professor at the Economic and Social Research Institute quantified the transfers at 10.8 billion Euro annually. In late 2018 The Irish Times estimated that the subvention had risen to £10.8 billion, about a quarter of Northern Ireland's GDP.

== Currency ==
The official currency in use in Northern Ireland is the British pound sterling. The euro, in use in the Republic of Ireland, is also accepted by some retailers.

Three Northern Irish banks print their own sterling-denominated banknotes: Bank of Ireland, Danske Bank, and Ulster Bank.

First Trust Bank also printed sterling-denominated banknotes until 2019, when a commercial decision was made to cease printing operations. First Trust banknotes stopped being legal tender on 30 June 2022.

The central bank of the UK is the Bank of England.

== Energy ==
Energy policy in the province is set by the Department for the Economy.

Primary energy consumption (yearly)
Source	GWh	%
Coal	1,169.1	14.4
Oil	24.3	0.3
Gas	4,178.1	51.5
Wind	2,439.8	30.0
Solar	162.7	2.0
Hydro	15.2	0.2
Other renewable	364.1	4.5
Net Imports	−236.8	−2.9
Total	8,119.5	100

=== Electricity ===
Northern Ireland's electrical grid is operated by System Operator for Northern Ireland (SONI) and the distribution is managed by Northern Ireland Electricity (NIE) which owns and manages the infrastructure which connects over 850,000 customers. Electricity consumption in Northern Ireland was 7,867 GW·h in 2002/3. At 4.6 MW·h per person, this is 18% less than that of the rest of the United Kingdom (5.6 MW·h per person). There are three main power stations in Northern Ireland: Ballylumford & Kilroot power stations located in County Antrim and Coolkeeragh power station in County Londonderry. The electricity grid throughout the island of Ireland is operated as a single system, with separate control centers in Dublin and Belfast.

Northern Ireland's electrical grid is connected to that of the Republic of Ireland by three cross-border interconnectors. The main interconnector, between Tandragee and County Louth has a capacity of 1,200 MW. Two back-up interconnectors have a combined capacity of 240 MW. This combined all-island grid is connected to the National Grid on Great Britain by the 500 MW Moyle interconnector, under the North Channel.

=== Gas ===
Gas for the Greater Belfast area is supplied via the Scotland-Northern Ireland pipeline (SNIP), a 24-inch-diameter (610 mm) interconnector. SSE Airtricity and Firmus Energy supply gas to the Greater Belfast area via Phoenix Natural Gas' network.

In the other areas of Northern Ireland, specifically towards Derry City, gas comes from two interconnector pipelines, one being supplied by the Republic's gas supplier, Bord Gáis. The North-West pipeline from Carrickfergus in County Antrim to Derry opened in November 2004, and the south–north pipeline from Gormanston (in the Republic) to Antrim was opened in October 2006. The complete south–north pipeline to Dublin opened in November 2007, passing Armagh, Banbridge, Craigavon and Newry. Since December 2005, Bord Gáis has supplied gas to residential customers in this area under the name Firmus Energy.

=== Coal ===
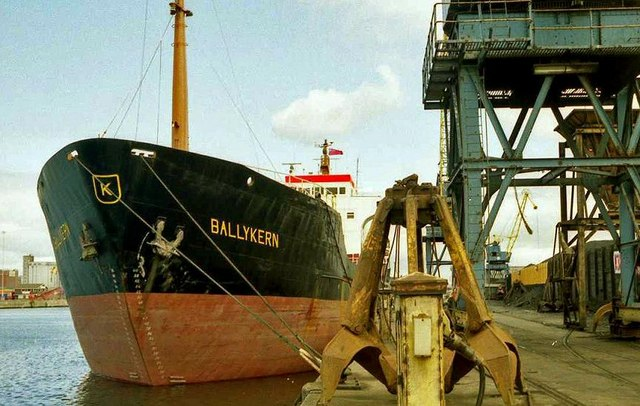
The "Ballykern" coal boat discharging coal at Queen's Quay, August 1990

The coal industry in Northern Ireland peaked in the 20th-century. This area became known as the "coal quay". The big three coal companies were Cawoods Coal, Hugh Craig & Co. and John Kelly Limited.

== Transport ==
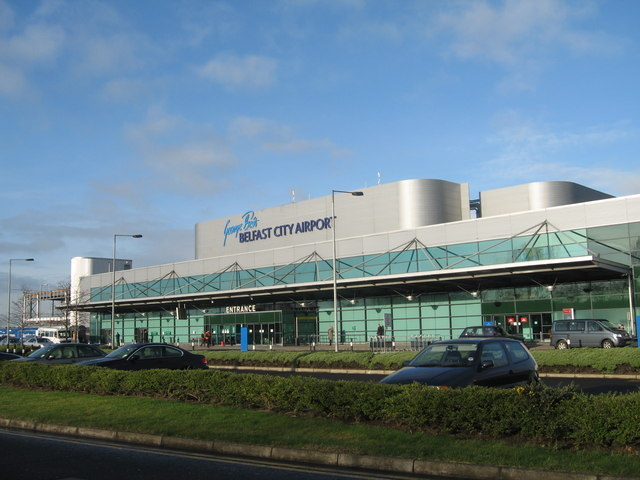
George Best Belfast City Airport

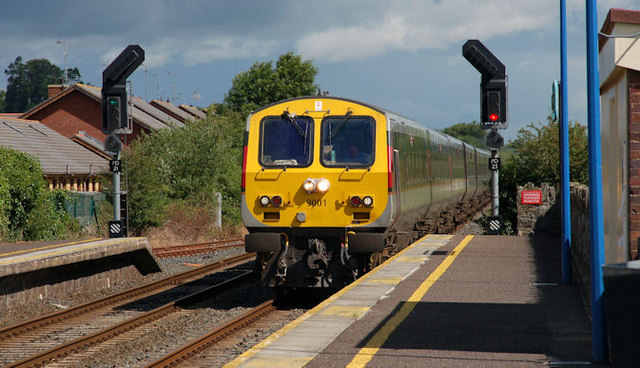
The Enterprise passing Poyntzpass

Northern Ireland has a total of 24,820 km (15,420 mi) of roads, or 1 km for each 68 people (1 mi for each 109 people), which is considerably more than in the United Kingdom as a whole (1 km per 162 people). There are seven motorways in Northern Ireland, extending radially from Belfast, and connecting that city to Antrim, Dungannon, Lisburn, Newtownabbey, and Portadown.

Northern Ireland Railways (NIR) runs passenger trains and presently carries no freight. NIR connects Belfast Grand Central and Lanyon Place to Antrim, Ballymena, Coleraine, Portrush, Derry along the Northern Corridor and the Belfast Suburban Rail network serves places near Belfast, along with the Enterprise (train service) connecting Lisburn, Portadown, Newry and across the border along the Dublin-Belfast railway line to Dublin Connolly.

Northern Ireland has three civilian airports: Belfast City, Belfast International, and City of Derry. Only Belfast City Airport is served by train, from Sydenham station on the Bangor Line.

Major seaports in Northern Ireland include the Port of Belfast, the Port of Londonderry and the Port of Larne. The Port of Belfast is one of the chief ports of the United Kingdom, handling 17 million tonnes (16.7 million long tons) of goods in 2005 By 2022, the Port of Belfast handled 24.5 million tonnes of trade per year as well as 1.8 million people and 141 cruise ships.

In addition to these existing links, several organisations have proposed a tunnel under the North Channel, with one possible site connecting the eastern part of Northern Ireland to Wigtownshire. The idea has been given technical consideration since the 19th century.

Construction of the Narrow Water Bridge, a 195-metre cable-stayed bridge connecting Warrenpoint in County Down with Omeath in County Louth, commenced in June 2024 and is expected to be complete by late 2027.

== Data ==
The Northern Ireland Statistics and Research Agency (NISRA) is the principal source of official statistics on Northern Ireland. These statistics and research inform public policy and associated debate in the wider society. NISRA is an Agency of the Department of Finance and Personnel.

Alongside official national statistics a number of respected private sector surveys are used to understand how the economy is performing. These include the British Chambers of Commerce Quarterly Economic Survey which has information on the performance of Northern Irish businesses since 1989.

== Regional disparity / North-south divide ==
There are huge regional disparities in the UK with GDP per capita ranging from £23,000 in the North East of England to £56,450 in London in 2024. In 2024, the GDP per capita in NI was £25,399.

Between 1998 and 2024, the economy of NI grew by 38%, compared to the overall UK average of 41%.

In 2017, 70% of the most deprived areas in NI were in Belfast and Derry City, with areas within both cities forming the ten most deprived areas in the region; however, Fermanagh, Omagh and Mid-Ulster were found to be the most deprived areas in terms of access to services.

== See also ==
- Economy of the Republic of Ireland
- Economy of the United Kingdom
- Countries of the United Kingdom by GVA per capita
- List of regions of the United Kingdom by GRP
- Northern Ireland fiscal balance
- Invest Northern Ireland
