= Beaghmore =

Early Bronze Age complex in Northern Ireland

Coordinates: 54°42′05″N 6°56′19″W

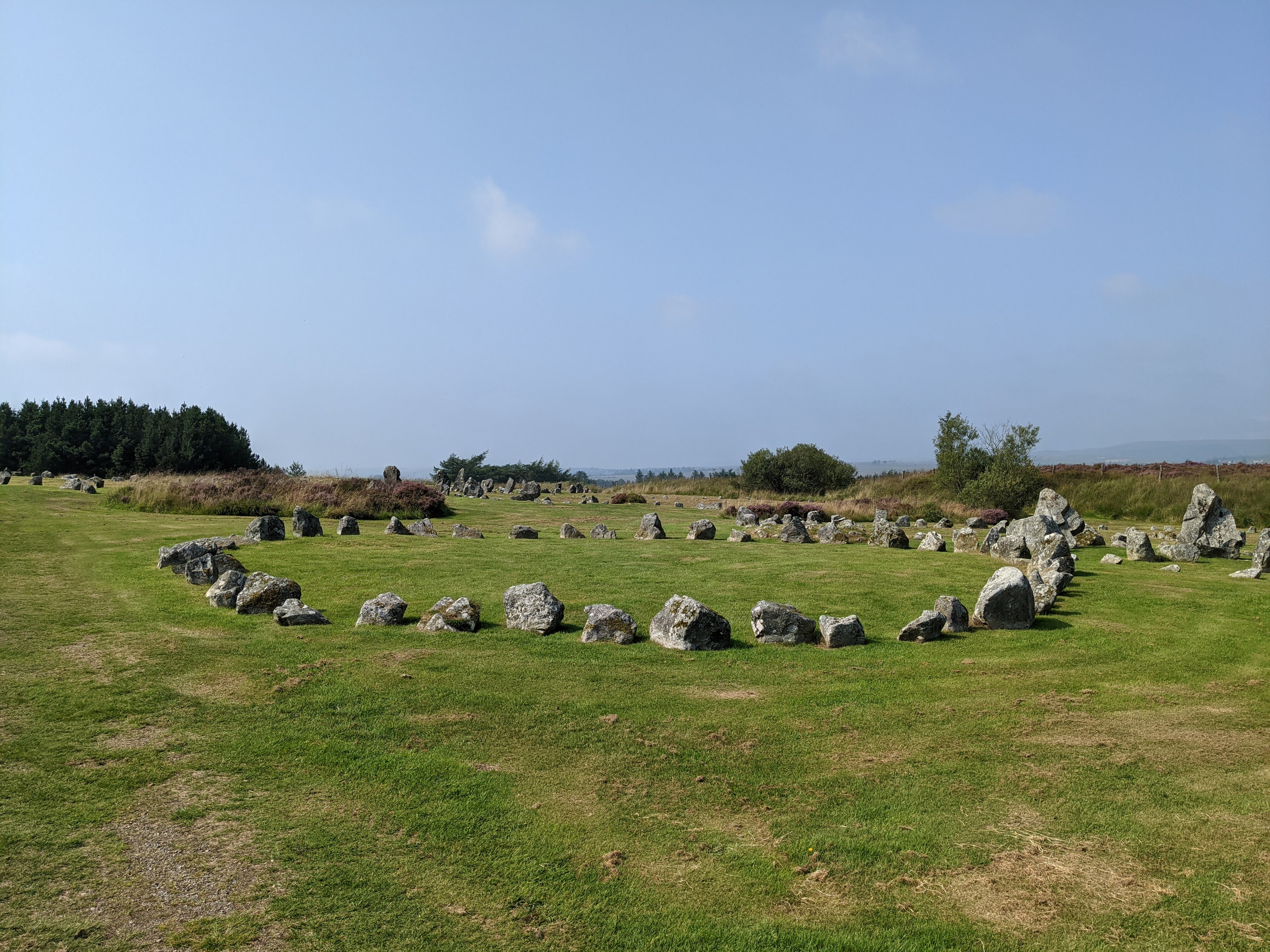
A stone circle at Beaghmore.

Map of Beaghmore

Beaghmore is a complex of early Bronze Age megalithic features, stone circles and cairns, 8.5 miles north west of Cookstown, County Tyrone in Northern Ireland, on the south-east edge of the Sperrin Mountains.

Mackay's Dictionary of Ulster Place-names says that it is from Irish an Bheitheach Mhór, meaning "big place of birch trees", a name that reflects the fact that the area was a woodland before being cleared by Neolithic farmers.

Beaghmore stone circles, alignments and cairns are State Care Historic Monuments in the townland of Beaghmore, in the Cookstown District Council area, grid ref: Area of H684 842. At Beaghmore a cairn (grid ref: H6872 8470), a cairn (grid ref: H6856 8472), stone circles, alignments and cairns (grid ref: area of H684 842), round cairn with standing stones: Bradley's Cairn (grid ref: H6830 8401) and cairn and alignment (grid ref: H6863 8431), are all Scheduled Historic Monuments.

== Excavation ==
The site was discovered by George Barnett in the late 1930s during peat cutting when 1,269 stones were uncovered, and partially excavated in 1945–1949 when it was taken into state care. It was also excavated again in 1965. Hearths and deposits of flint tools were discovered and have been carbon dated to 2900-2600BC. Several of the stone rows run over the tumbled walls of field structures which also date from the Neolithic period. Excavation of one of the cairns revealed a polished porcellanite axe, which may have originated from the Tievebulliagh axe factory, some 70 miles away in County Antrim. The largest cairn featured a central pit containing an oak branch.

== Features ==
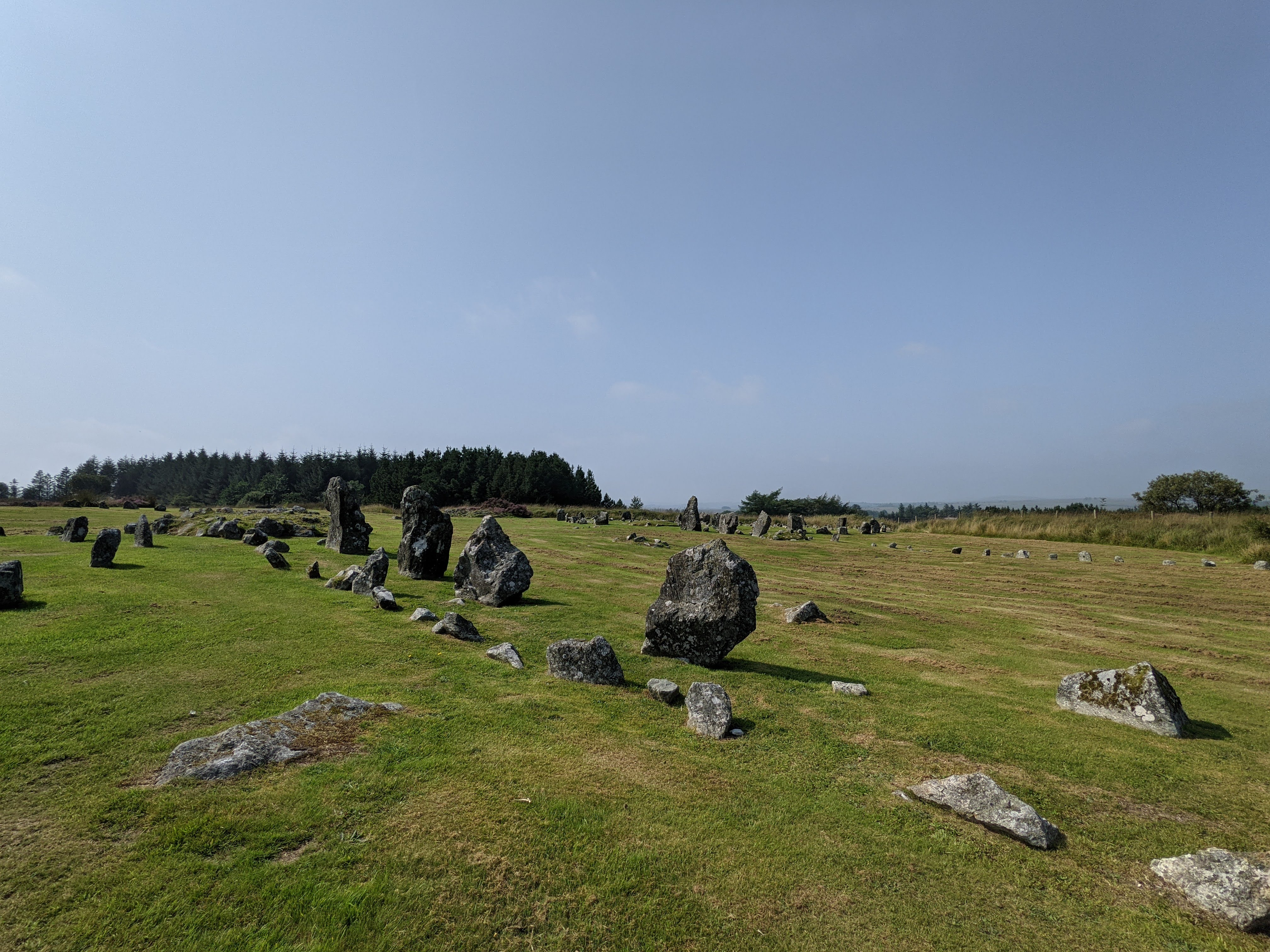
A stone row at Beaghmore.

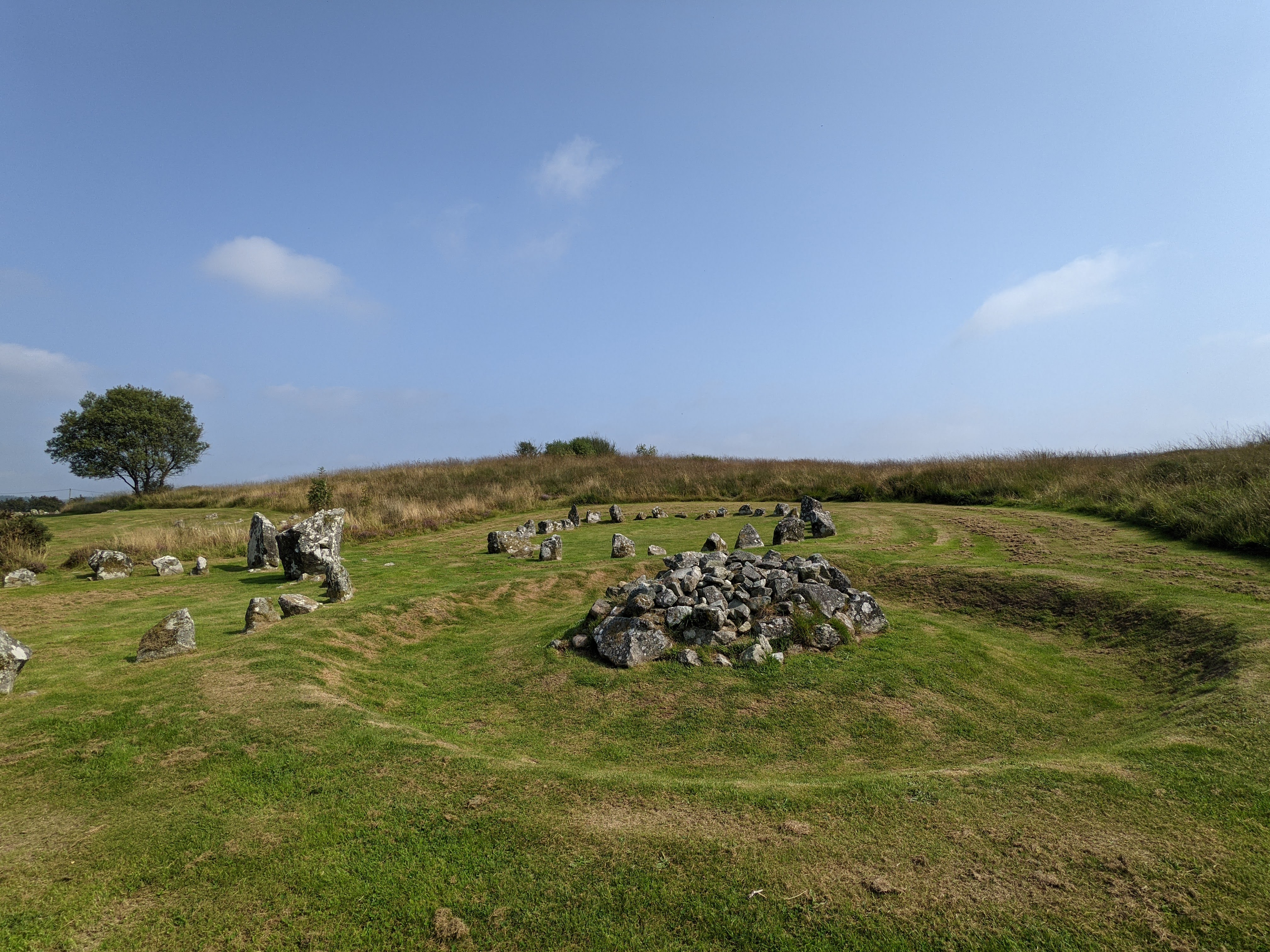
A cairn at Beaghmore.

There are seven low stone circles of different sizes, six of which are paired, twelve cairns and ten stone rows. The circles are between 10 and 20m in diameter, and are associated with earlier burial cairns and alignments of stone rows lead towards them. The stones are small with few more than 0.5m in height and the circles are distorted, suggesting they are related to kerbs surrounding some megalithic tombs. A typical feature of the stone rows is a high and low arrangement where short rows of tall stones run beside much longer rows of small stones. The stone rows radiate from the circles in a roughly north-east direction.

== Function ==
Excavation has revealed that the site overlays a Neolithic cultivation site, and it is thought that the stones may have been erected in response to deteriorating soil fertility and the encroachment of peat. Another theory states that Beaghmore was a large ceremonial site and was constructed between 1500 and 800 BC.

== See also ==
- List of archaeological sites in County Tyrone

== Sources ==
- McNally, Kenneth (2006). "Ireland's Ancient Stones" (Belfast: Appletree Press). ISBN 0-86281-996-2
