= Dundressan =

Dundressan: Irish: Dun Dreasán
- County: County Antrim
- Country: Northern Ireland
- Sovereign state: United Kingdom
- Post town: LARNE
- Postcode district: BT40
- Dialling code: 028

Dundressan (from Irish Dun Dreasán, meaning 'fort of the brambles') is a townland of 255 acres in County Antrim, Northern Ireland. It is situated in the civil parish of Islandmagee and the historic barony of Belfast Lower.

== See also ==
- List of townlands in County Antrim
