= Mill Bay =

Mill Bay may refer to:

- Mill Bay, Alaska, United States
- Mill Bay, British Columbia, Canada
- Mill Bay, Northern Ireland
- Millbay, Plymouth, England
- Nanjizal, Cornwall, England
- MV Mill Bay a ferry in British Columbia
