= Economy of Ireland =

Economy of Ireland may refer to:

- Economy of the Republic of Ireland, the economy of a sovereign state in Europe
- Economy of Northern Ireland, the economy of a part of the United Kingdom
