= Broadstone =

Broadstone or Broad Stone may refer to:

== Dublin, Ireland ==
- Broadstone, Dublin, an inner city area of Dublin, Ireland
  - Dublin Broadstone railway station, a former railway station and current LUAS station in the Dublin suburb
  - Broadstone railway works, a former railway workshop surrounding the station now used as bus garages

== Poole, Dorset, England ==
- Broadstone, Dorset, a suburb of Poole
  - Broadstone (Dorset) railway station, a disused station
  - Broadstone (ward), an electoral division

== Other uses ==
- Broadstone (Somerset) railway station, England, a disused station
- Broadstone, Kent
- Broadstone, Shropshire
- Broadstone, Monmouthshire
- Broadstone, North Ayrshire, site of an old castle and barony
- Broad Stone (County Antrim), or Craigs Dolmen, a megalthic monument and archaeological site in Northern Ireland
- Marion Broadstone (1906–1972), American football player
