= Firmus Energy =

Northern Ireland energy company

Firmus Energy is an energy company based in Antrim, Northern Ireland.

Bord Gáis had a plan to develop the gas market in Northern Ireland. A pipeline from Carrickfergus to Derry was completed in October 2004 and now serves Coolkeeragh Power Station. A second pipeline, known as the south–north pipeline, was commissioned in October 2006. It runs from Gormanston in the Republic of Ireland to join the Carrick/Derry pipeline near Antrim creating an all-Ireland network and providing redundancy in case of problems with either Scotland-Northern Ireland pipeline or the Scotland - Republic of Ireland interconnectors.

The Northern Ireland Authority for Energy Regulation awarded Bord Gáis a licence to supply homes and businesses in the towns and cities near the two pipelines - Antrim, Armagh, Ballymena, Ballymoney, Banbridge, Craigavon, Derry, Limavady and Newry - where the local subsidiaries of Bord Gáis use the trading name of Firmus Energy. On 1 December 2005, Firmus launched their first supply in Northern Ireland, to the large Michelin tyre factory in Ballymena. On 25 April 2006 firmus connected its first residential customers in Derry.

The decision to award this licence was widely disputed and Phoenix Gas, the incumbent in Belfast and the surrounding area, launched a judicial review of the decision to award it to BGE, they claimed that it was more of a political decision and they claimed that Bord Gáis will lose a significant amount of money and that the business will be loss making.

Firmus Energy is also competing to supply gas and electricity to large industrial and commercial customers across Northern Ireland. They supply gas in Belfast to Northern Ireland's largest bakery, Allied Bakeries and have been awarded an electricity supply licence. On 30 March 2009, the company said it had signed up Ballymena soft drinks manufacturer Norbev as its first electricity customer.

In the autumn of 2009, a consortium of Bord Gáis Energy (Northern Ireland) and Storengy, a company of GDF Suez, undertook a seismic survey of land in the Larne area to determine if there are salt layers that could be used for the storage of natural gas. The survey confirmed the existence of the salt and a test borehole will be dug in Spring 2011 to confirm it has suitable mechanical properties.

In October 2010, Firmus Energy extended competition in the Northern Ireland electricity market in parts of the agriculture sector by offering a discount on some current Northern Ireland Electricity tariffs to members of the Ulster Farmers' Union.

In January 2011, Firmus Energy launched an offer for domestic gas customers in and around Belfast, claiming to be 'at least 7.5% cheaper than Phoenix'.

In December 2013, Bord Gáis Éireann agreed to sell Firmus to a Centrica-led consortium, with Firmus eventually being taken on by Icon Infrastructure.

In January 2019, Equitix bought Firmus from iCON infrastructure.
