= Mill Bay, County Antrim =

Village in County Antrim, Northern Ireland

Coordinates: 54°49′27″N 5°44′56″W

Millbay is a small Hamlet on Islandmagee in County Antrim, Northern Ireland. Originally called Carnspindle Bay, nicknamed Millbay as there was a mill in the bay.Millbay is within the townland of Carnspindle. It is in the Larne Borough Council area. In the 2011 census it had a population of 103 people (40 households).

Ballylumford Dolmen, locally known as the "Druid's Altar", is an archeological site where artifacts from an ancient burial chamber have been recovered.

== See also ==
- List of towns and villages in Northern Ireland
