= Glynn, County Antrim =

Village in County Antrim, Northern Ireland

- Village and civil parish
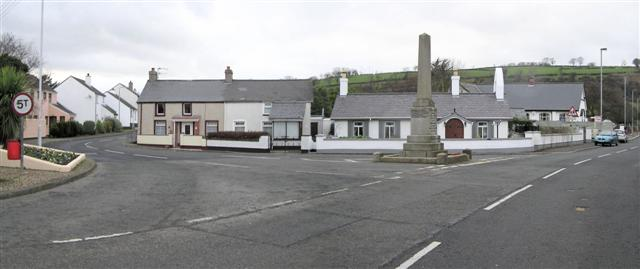
- Glynn, County Antrim

- Location within the United Kingdom
- Coordinates: 54°49′N 5°49′W
- Country: Northern Ireland
- County: County Antrim

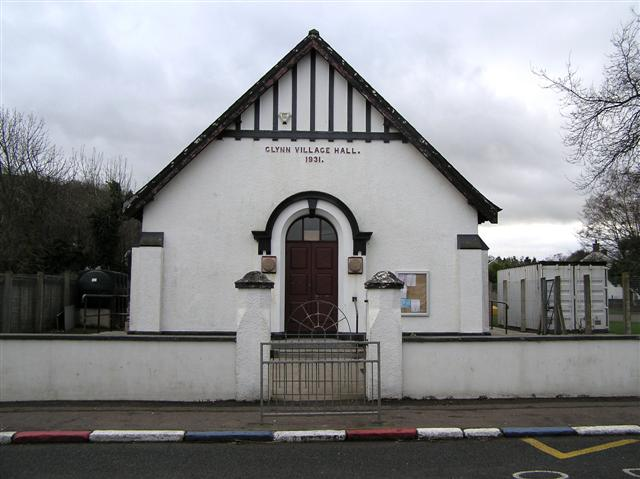
Glynn village hall

Glynn (from Irish an Gleann, meaning 'the valley') is a small village and civil parish in the Mid and East Antrim Borough Council area of County Antrim, Northern Ireland. It lies a short distance south of Larne, on the shore of Larne Lough. As of the 2011 census, the Glynn ward had a population of 2,027 people.

== History ==
St. Patrick is said to have built the Church of Gluaire around 435 A.D. Within the town limits, the remnants of a historic stone church can still be found. The county of Antrim was once divided into the districts of North Clandeboye and Glynns (Glynnes). The region was a vicarage in the Diocese of Connor and the ecclesiastical province of Armagh, and it was a gift from Marquess of Donegall.

The village is then mentioned in a grant from King James I to Arthur Lord Chichester, Baron of Belfast, of his estates in Antrim, Down and Carrickfergus. This grant was dated 20 November 1620. In a later grant from King Charles II to Edward, Viscount Chichester, Glynn was mentioned as being part of the territory of Magheramorne.

In 1597, Sir John Chichester, governor of Carrickfergus, was beheaded by James MacSorley MacDonnell at a site on the eastern edge of the village. MacSorley MacDonnell and his men had made a feint on Carrickfergus town. They were then pursued to the glen of Altrackyn, some five miles (8 km) from Glynn. Chichester was captured and his men were nearly cut to pieces. Later in the day, Chichester was beheaded by MacSorley MacDonnell on a stone. A 'standing stone' still stands to this day, approximately one mile east of the village.

The lime factory and Ballylig were purchased by Associated Portland Cement Manufacturers (now Blue Circle) in the early 20th century, and a large cement plant was erected near the quay. The factory grew to be a substantial employer in the surrounding area.

In the 1930s, Glynn was seen on the 'big screen' in the movie The Luck Of The Irish. A number of local people were employed as extras in the film, which starred Hollywood actor Richard Hayward.

From the 1930s Glynn saw expansion with many of the thatched cottages being replaced by modern family housing. The first phase was approximately 100 houses and bungalows at Glenvale Park, built in the 1950s. Then, in the late 1960s, eighteen houses were built at Glenside. These were followed by more houses and bungalows at Hawthorne Grove in the 1970s. All these properties were built by the government for renting. Further housing developments have taken place in the 1980s at Glenavon and in the 1990s at Craiganboy. The latter two developments were built privately for sale. It is estimated that there are now approximately 350 occupied dwelling houses in Glynn (April 2004).

In 2006, there were a number of new housing developments in Glynn in which several bungalows were built on the Glenburn Road and adjacent the Jubilee park behind Hawthorne Grove estate.

== Places of interest ==
Out in Larne Lough lies Swan Island. There are actually two small islands, one of which is a bird sanctuary. The larger of the two islands measures approximately fifty yards in length by fifteen yards in width. It is covered in grass, shingle and sand. The smaller of the two islands can only be seen at low tide. The larger island was previously called Pigeon Island and then Duck Island. It was let in the early 19th century for one guinea per annum to burn kelp.

According to records from the 19th century, the larger Swan Isle was said to contain the bodies of the crew of some foreign ships who died of some plague, while the ships were laid under quarantine in Larne Lough, and would not be permitted to enter the harbour. The smaller island was supposed to be where the bodies of the dead sailors were burnt before burial on the larger island.

Swan Island and the lough shore at Glynn is now visited by ornithologists and birdwatchers - who come to see birds like swans, gulls, terns, oystercatchers and sandpipers.

== Landowners ==
In the 18th and 19th centuries the 'proprietors' within the wider parish were John Irving Esquire, M.P., who lived at Ballylig House, Magheramorne. John Irving owned lime kilns and wharfs at Magheramore and extensive lands and property in the area. His agent, Thomas Maxwell Esquire, J.P., lived in a plain but modern house, overlooking Larne Lough, approximately one mile north of Glynn. Ballylig House still stands and was better known a few years ago as Magheramorne House Hotel. More recently however, the house has been the Ireland Head Office for Forever Living Products (Ireland) Ltd. The former house of Thomas Maxwell also still stands and is privately owned.

Within Glynn village, Randall William Johnston Esquire was the owner of mills, public buildings, houses and land. Johnston was a descendant of an officer in King William's army. Miss McClaverty rented 17 acres (69,000 m^{2}) of land and the houses from Johnston and lived nearby.

== Transport ==
Glynn lies on a suburban rail route from Belfast to Larne. It is served by Northern Ireland Railways trains on the Larne Line. Glynn railway station opened on 1 January 1864 and was closed for goods traffic in 1933. There is also a bus service between the village and Larne.

Larne, which is one of Northern Ireland's major sea ports, is a short drive from Glynn and Larne Harbour railway station is nearby. P&O Ferries, to and from Larne, regularly travel to Cairnryan in Scotland.

== Tourism ==
Glynn lies within the Mid and East Antrim Borough Council area. Tourist facilities locally are provided by Mid and East Antrim Borough Council.

== Education ==
There is a small primary school in the village. It stands approximately 200 metres from the former school building (an old village landmark—reappropriated for bungalow housing). The school comprises two main classrooms and an assembly hall situated within the main building. Additional classroom space has been provided by way of two external mobile classrooms pending an extension project. At present there are around 70 children in attendance; ranging from ages four to eleven. Extracurricular activities undertaken at the school include football, rugby, hockey, dance, and choir.

== Demographics ==
Glynn is classified as a village by the NI Statistics and Research Agency (NISRA) (i.e. with population between 1,000 and 2,250 people). As of the 2011 census there were 2,027 people living in the Glynn ward. Of these:

- 20.03% were aged under 16 and 16.28% were aged 65 and over
- 50.81% of the population were male and 49.19% were female
- 7.45% were from a Catholic background and 84.66% were from a Protestant background
- 3.04% of people aged 16–74 were unemployed.

== See also ==
- List of civil parishes of County Antrim
