= List of archaeological sites in County Antrim =

List of archaeological sites in County Antrim, Northern Ireland:

== A ==
- Aghalee, Church and graveyard, grid ref: J1275 6548
- Aghalislone, Rath, grid ref: J2599 6792
- Aghalislone, Barrow, grid ref: J2549 6825
- Aldfreck, Enclosure with structure, grid ref: J4475 9607
- Altagore, Cashel, grid ref: D2495 3488
- Altilevelly, Motte: Dunisland Fort, grid ref: J3722 9729
- Antrim Round Tower, Antrim, grid ref: J1544 8770
- Antynanum, Court tomb, grid ref: D2556 1094
- Ardclinis, Church and graveyard, grid ref: D2717 2499
- Armoy Round Tower, Armoy, grid ref: D0778 3325
- Aughnaholle, Barrow cemetery, grid ref: D2339 3822
- Aughnahoy, Standing stone, grid ref: C9875 0245
- Aughnamullan, Bivallate rath, grid ref: J1985 7713
- Ault alias Gowkstown, Wedge tomb: Giant’s Grave, grid ref: D3161 1082

== B ==
- Ballinderry, Medieval church site, grid ref: J1168 6821
- Ballinderry, Crannog, grid ref: J1143 6800
- Ballinloughan, Ring barrow, grid ref: D2366 3877
- Ballintoy Demesne, Cave and occupation site: Potters Cave or Park Cave, grid ref: D0293 4488
- Balloo, Mound, grid ref: J1387 8674
- Ballyaghagan, Round cairn, grid ref: J3233 7973
- Ballyaghagan, Promontory fort: McArt’s Fort, grid ref: J3250 7959
- Ballyaghagan, Cashel, grid ref: J3128 7936
- Ballyaghagan, Kidney-shaped enclosure, grid ref: J3247 7960
- Ballyalbanagh and Ballynashee, Hilltop round cairn, grid ref: J2778 9794
- Ballyalbanagh, Court tomb, grid ref: J2874 9754
- Ballyalbanagh, Rectangular enclosure and field system, grid ref: J2891 9673
- Ballyboley, Court tomb: Carndoo or the Abbey, grid ref: J3284 9731
- Ballybracken Barrow, grid ref: J2231 9341
- Ballyclare Motte, grid ref: J2916 9123
- Ballycleagh Standing Stones, grid ref: D2485 3339
- Ballycowan Rath, rath and souterrain, grid ref: J1340 9927
- Ballycraigy Mound, grid ref: J1710 8552
- Ballyharry
- Ballylumford Dolmen (a.k.a. Druid's Altar), Islandmagee, portal tomb, grid ref: D4304 0160
- Ballynashee and Ballyalbanagh, Hilltop round cairn, grid ref: J2778 9794
- The Broad Stone, grid ref: C9793 1756; see Craigs Dolmen

== C ==
- Carndoo Court Tomb, (a.k.a. The Abbey Court Tomb), grid ref: J3284 9731
- Chi-Rho Stone, Kilraughts, Ballymoney
- Craigs Dolmen, Rasharkin, passage grave, grid ref: C9740 1729

== D ==
- Dalways Bawn, Carrickfergus, grid ref: J4427 9141
- Doagh Hole Stone, Doagh
- Dooey's Cairn (a.k.a. Ballymacaldrack Court Tomb), Dunloy, court tomb, grid ref: D0215 1830
- Drumnadrough Rath, grid ref: J3302 8117
- Dunisland Fort, motte, grid ref: J3722 9729

== G ==
- Giants Ring, Belfast, henge and passage grave, grid ref: J3272 6770
- Giant's Grave, wedge tomb, grid ref: D3161 1082

== H ==
- Harryville Motte, Ballymena, Motte-and-bailey, grid ref: D1122 0260

== L ==
- Lissanduff Fort, Antrim
- Lissue Rath, grid ref: J2277 6325
- Lough-Na-Crannagh, Fair Head, crannog
- Lurigethan Fort, Glenariff

== M ==
- McArt's Fort, Promontory fort in Ballyaghagan townland, grid ref: J3250 7959
- Moyadam, standing stone, grid ref: J2510 8831

== O ==
- Ossian's Grave (a.k.a. Cloghbrack), Cushendall, grid ref: D2128 2847

== P ==
- Potters Cave (a.k.a. Park Cave), cave and occupation site, grid ref: D0293 4488

== S ==
- Slaght Standing Stones, grid ref: D1473 3482

== T ==
- Tievebulliagh, Glens of Antrim, round cairn and Neolithic axe factory, grid ref: area of D193 266
