= Carnspindle =

Carnspindle: Irish: Carn Spinnil
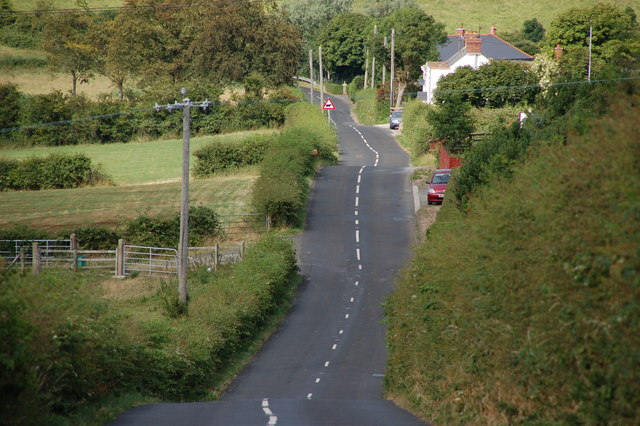
- Carnspindle in 2006
- County: County Antrim
- Country: Northern Ireland
- Sovereign state: United Kingdom
- Post town: LARNE
- Postcode district: BT40
- Dialling code: 028

Carnspindle (from Irish Carn Spinnil, meaning 'cairn of the sandbank') is a townland of 217 acres in County Antrim, Northern Ireland. It is situated in the civil parish of Islandmagee and the historic barony of Belfast Lower.

The small village of Mill Bay is within the townland.

== See also ==
- List of townlands in County Antrim
