= Ballyharry =

Coordinates: 54°48′24″N 5°43′15″W

Ballyharry: Irish: Baile h-Araidh
- Location within Northern Ireland
- County: County Antrim
- Country: Northern Ireland
- Sovereign state: United Kingdom
- Post town: LARNE
- Postcode district: BT40
- Dialling code: 028

Ballyharry (/ˌbæliˈhæri/ BAL-ee-HARR-ee; from Irish Baile h-Araidh, meaning 'town of the charioteer') is a townland of 224 acres and an area of archaeological sites on Islandmagee, in County Antrim, Northern Ireland, where a number of well-preserved Neolithic house sites have been investigated. The townland is situated in the civil parish of Islandmagee and the historic barony of Belfast Lower.

== See also ==
- List of archaeological sites in County Antrim
- List of townlands in County Antrim
