= Mullaghboy =

Village in County Antrim, Northern Ireland

Coordinates: 54°50′03″N 5°43′34″W

Mullaghboy: Irish: Mullach Buidhe
- Population: 364 (2011 Census)
- County: County Antrim
- Country: Northern Ireland
- Sovereign state: United Kingdom
- Post town: LARNE
- Postcode district: BT40
- Dialling code: 028

Mullaghboy (from Irish Mullach Buidhe, meaning 'yellow summit') is a small village and townland (of 251 acres) on Islandmagee in County Antrim, Northern Ireland. It is situated in the civil parish of Islandmagee and the historic barony of Belfast Lower. It is within the Larne Borough Council area. It had a population of 364 people (148 households) in the 2011 Census. (2001 Census: 294 people).
