= Premier Power =

Premier Power Limited is an electricity supply company in Northern Ireland.

The company was formed in 1992 following the privatization of electricity supply in Northern Ireland. Previously, Northern Ireland Electricity was responsible for the running of the country's power stations and transmission. British Gas (now BG Group) bought Ballylumford power station from NIE and formed Premier Power to run it.

On 12 August 2010 the AES Corporation announced that its subsidiary, AES Ballylumford Holdings Limited, had acquired Premier Power through an all-cash transaction for £102 million (approximately $160 million), which included purchase price and working capital adjustment. The transaction was announced on 2 July 2010, and was subject to licence consents from the Northern Ireland Authority for Utility Regulation and the Northern Ireland Department of Enterprise, Trade and Investment.

Through the Ballylumford facility, Premier Power generates 50% of Northern Ireland's electricity and 17% of all Ireland's.

== See also ==
- List of Irish companies
- Energy policy of the United Kingdom
- Energy use and conservation in the United Kingdom
- Green electricity in the United Kingdom
