= George Barnett (historian) =

Irish historian, archaeologist, botanist, geologist, folklorist and poet

- Born: 11 February 1876; Owenreagh, Sixtowns, Draperstown, Ireland
- Died: 10 April 1965 (aged 89); Owenreagh, Sixtowns, Draperstown, N. Ireland
- Resting place: St. Anne's Church, Sixtowns, Draperstown, N. Ireland
- Other name: Geordie
- Occupations: Local historian, archaeologist, botanist, geologist, folklorist and poet
- Known for: Discovery of Beaghmore Stone Circles, expertise on Sperrin Mountain ranges

George Barnett (11 February 1876 – 10 April 1965) was an Irish historian, archaeologist, botanist, geologist, folklorist and poet. Self-taught, he acquired a vast knowledge of the Sperrin Mountains through experience, experimentation, observation, and traditional lore. He discovered many prehistoric sites, although he is best known for his discovery of the Beaghmore stone circles, and developed the theory that they were an ancient lunar observatory. This theory was expressed in his poem, The Beaghmore Stone Circles.

== The Beaghmore Stone Circles ==
Ceremonial occasions they often had there,
They knew every day, aye, and week in the year,
For fifty-two weeks they had stones in a ring,
Thirteen in a line for the time the call Spring.

The same for Summer, that time of great joy,
Twenty-six for the Autumn and Winter stands nigh,
Four stones that are bigger stand up in a line,
For midsummer sunrise and midwinter time.

One stone by the circle's a day it appears,
Another convenient makes out the leap years,
You can soon make them out, if you look the place o'er,
Twixt the eastern circle and mighty big four.

== Field work ==
Well known to academics for his extensive local knowledge and experience of the Sperrins, he assisted many field expeditions, and is recognised in the published findings. Upon his death, Professor E.E. Evans, Ireland's first professor of Geography, wrote:

"George Barnett, who died on 10th April 1965, in his ninetieth year, was a man of rare quality who, with little formal education, won more than local fame for his knowledge of field archaeology, botany, and geology."

George Barnett at Beaghmore in the 1940s excavation. Taken by Andrew McL May and held at the Northern Ireland Environment Agency, Belfast.

== Pen name ==
In the 1920s, he used the pen name G.B. M'Keown (M'Keown being his mother's maiden name), when writing notes for the weekly column 'Nature and Antiquarian Notes' in the Northern Whig Newspaper. On 19 November 1927 his real identity was revealed to the public.
