= Ballylumford Dolmen =

Dolmen in County Antrim, Northern Ireland

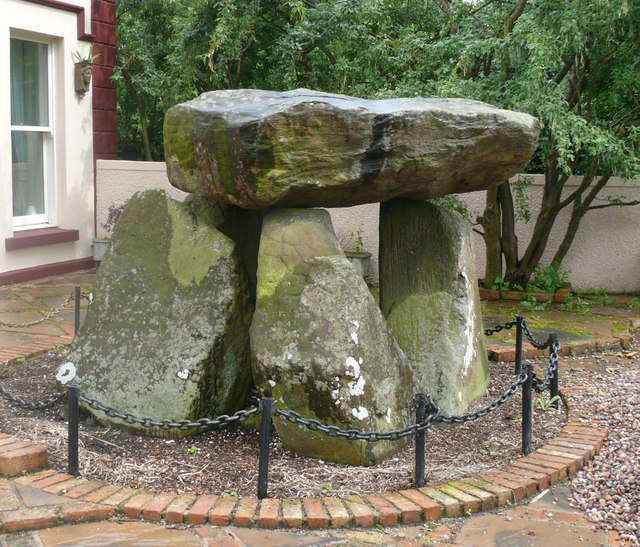
- The dolmen in 2007

- Location in Northern Ireland, United Kingdom
- 54°50′30″N 5°46′26″W
- Type: Dolmen
- Location: Northern Ireland, United Kingdom

History
- Built: c. 1800 BC

Site notes
- Material: Stone

The Ballylumford Dolmen is a dolmen in County Antrim, Northern Ireland. It is near the north-west tip of the Islandmagee peninsula by Ballylumford power station. Known locally as the "Druid's Altar", it could be 4,000 years old, or the remains of an even earlier passage grave. The dolmen consists of four upright stones, with a heavy capstone and a fallenstone within the structure. This may have been put there to block the entrance to the tomb. The dolmen is in the front garden of a house. A wall plaque at the site describes the dolmen as a single chambered grave erected around 2000-1600 BC. Local finds indicate occupation of the neighbourhood during the Bronze Age.

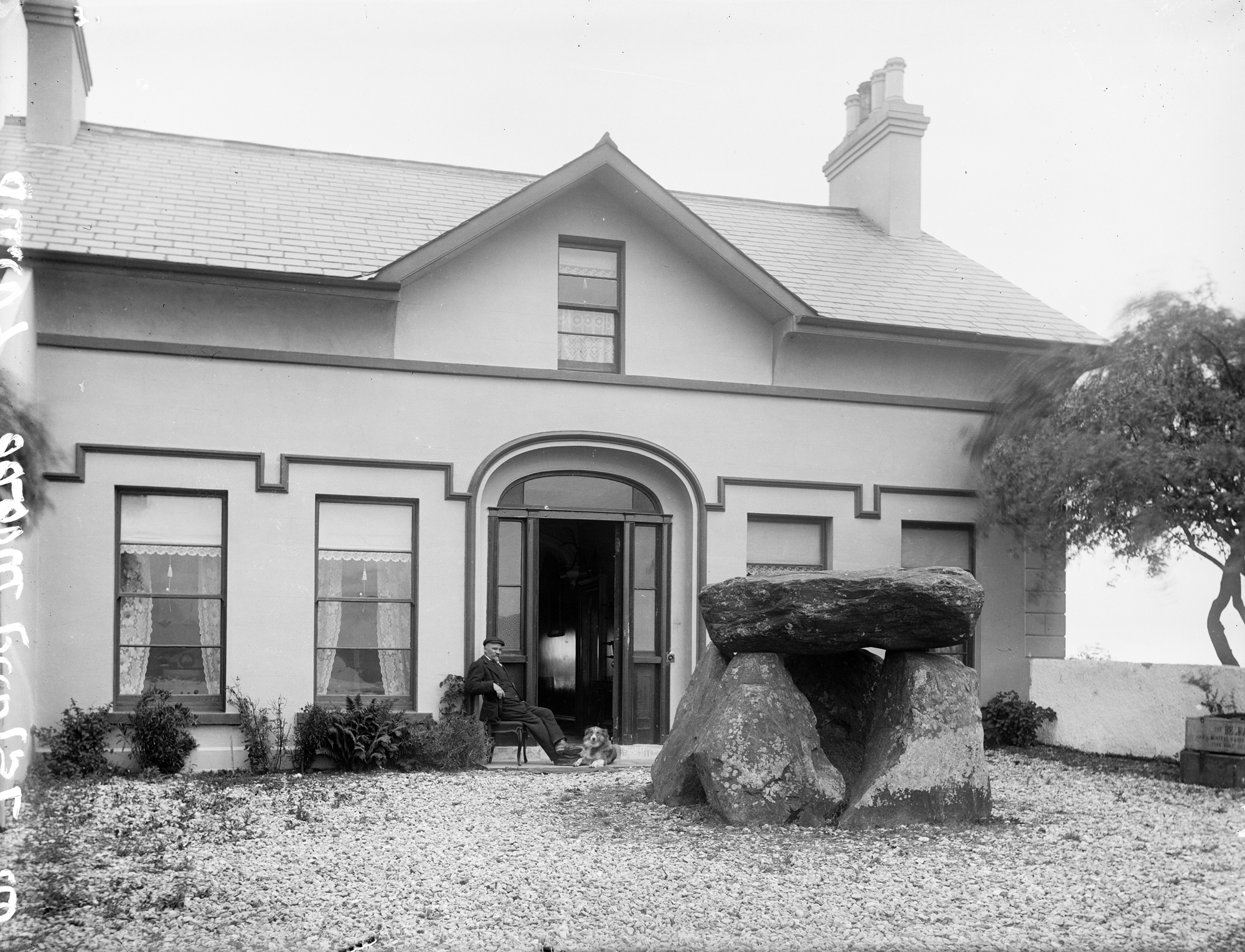
The dolmen c. 1910

The Ballylumford Dolmen is a portal tomb and a State Care Historic Monument in the townland of Ballylumford, in Larne Borough Council area at grid ref: D4304 0160.

== See also ==
- List of archaeological sites in County Antrim
