= Mullaghdubh =

Townland (administrative area) in County Antrim, Northern Ireland

Mullaghdubh (pronounced Mullaghhdoo and meaning Dark Hill) is a townland in Islandmagee, County Antrim, Northern Ireland.

The local Mullaghdubh Primary School and Kilcoan Primary School amalgamated to form Islandmagee Primary school.
