= Ballystrudder =

Village in County Antrim, Northern Ireland

Coordinates: 54°46′44″N 5°42′38″W

Ballystrudder: Irish: Baile Strudair
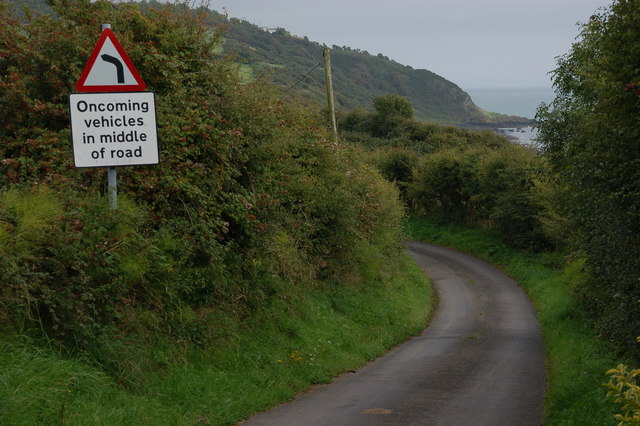
- Road near Ballystrudder in 2006

- Location within Northern Ireland
- Population: 992 (2011 census)
- District: Mid and East Antrim
- County: County Antrim
- Country: Northern Ireland
- Sovereign state: United Kingdom
- Post town: LARNE
- Postcode district: BT40
- Dialling code: 028

Ballystrudder or Ballystruder (from Irish Baile Strudair, meaning 'Strudar’s townland') is a small village and townland (of 255 acres) on Islandmagee in County Antrim, Northern Ireland. It is situated in the historic barony of Belfast Lower and the civil parish of Islandmagee. It is part of Mid and East Antrim Borough Council. It had a population of 992 people in the 2011 census.

== See also ==
- List of towns and villages in Northern Ireland
- List of townlands in County Antrim
