= Ballycarry =

Village in County Antrim, Northern Ireland

Coordinates: 54.774158°N 5.752716°W

Ballycarry: Irish: Baile Cora; Scots: Ballycarrie
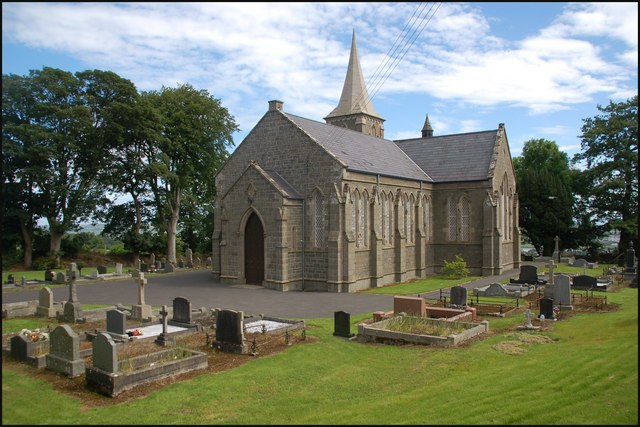
- St John's church, Ballycarry

- Location within Northern Ireland
- Population: 1,479 (2021 census)
- District: Mid and East Antrim
- County: County Antrim
- Country: Northern Ireland
- Sovereign state: United Kingdom
- Post town: CARRICKFERGUS
- Postcode district: BT38
- Dialling code: 028
- Police: Northern Ireland
- Fire: Northern Ireland
- Ambulance: Northern Ireland
- UK Parliament: East Antrim
- NI Assembly: East Antrim

Ballycarry (from Irish Baile Cora, meaning 'town of the weir or rocky ford') is a village in County Antrim, Northern Ireland. It is midway between Larne and Carrickfergus, overlooking Islandmagee, and is part of the Mid and East Antrim Borough Council area. In the 2021 census it had a population of 1,479.

== History ==
Neolithic artefacts found in the village suggest ancient settlement, while the Lislaynan ecclesiastical settlement looks back to a thousand years of Christian witness. There was also a Norman settlement in the area, at Redhall, and at Brackenberg, now the centre of modern Ballycarry. An early Christian stone coffin lid which was uncovered at Redhall in the 18th century, was reinstated in the Templecorran cemetery and displays an early Christian cross engraved within an arc.

== Community ==
The town is home to Ballycarry Presbyterian Church. Founded in 1613, Ballycarry is the oldest congregation in the Presbyterian Church in Ireland. The present church building dates from 1830. The Old Presbyterian (Non-Subscribing) Presbyterian Congregation also traces its roots back to 1613, and this congregation remained strongest in 1829 when the Presbyterian Church was split over the "subscription controversy", the non-subscribers leaving open the issue of subscription to the Westminster Confession of Faith. The Old Presbyterian Church is located on the main street in the village. The most imposing church building is that of St. John's Parish Church, the Church of Ireland congregation, built in the 19th century by the Ker family of Redhall.

Ballycarry Community Association organises the Broadisland Gathering community festival held each year on the first Saturday in September and associated dates. The gathering highlights the Ulster Scots heritage of the community and includes dancing, music, pipe bands, discussions, re-enactment, exhibitions and the Aul Kinntra Fair, revived from the 1930s but dating back to the 17th century.

Ballycarry's community association attracted funding for a modern community centre in the village in 2001. The association includes representatives from several local groups, including the three local churches, sports clubs, fraternities and social groups. In 2009, a number of events were held in Ballycarry to celebrate the 400th anniversary of the community being established in 1609.

== Transport ==
Ballycarry railway station was opened on 1 October 1862. The railway station is located about a mile from the village.

== Demographics ==
As of the 2001 census, Ballycarry was classified as a small village or hamlet by the Northern Ireland Statistics and Research Agency (NISRA) (i.e. with population between 500 and 1,000 people). On census day 2001, 29 April 2001, there were 981 people living in Ballycarry. Of these:

- 23.1% were aged under 16 years and 15.1% were aged 60 and over
- 50.2% of the population were male and 49.9% were female
- 2.9% were from a Catholic background and 92.3% were from a Protestant background
- 3.8% of people aged 16–74 were unemployed

== Notable people ==
- James Orr, known as the Bard of Ballycarry, was the foremost of the Ulster Weaver Poets, and was writing contemporaneously with Robert Burns. He was one of many Ulster Presbyterians who fled to America after taking part in the ill-fated United Irish Rising in 1798. He returned to Ballycarry under an amnesty and died in the village in 1816. An imposing monument to Orr, erected by local Freemasons in 1831, is sited in the adjacent Templecorran cemetery. In 2011 a tourist trail, the Weaver's Trail, was officially launched in Orr's honour by the Mayor of Larne, Cllr. Bobby McKee MBE, and was supported by the Heritage Lottery Fund.
- Rev. Edward Brice, the first Presbyterian minister in Ireland, came to Ballycarry in 1613 and ministered in the Templecorran Church, now in ruins. He was originally from Stirlingshire in Scotland and was brought to the village by William Edmondstone, who settled there in 1609. Brice was one of several Scottish clergymen who were forbidden to preach by the Established Church authorities in the 1630s.
- General Sir James Steele, who was born in Ballycarry, was the British Army officer who signed the mobilisation order to take the United Kingdom to war with Nazi Germany in 1939. He later played a part in the Dunkirk evacuation in 1940 and the Normandy landings in 1944. A memorial on the village green highlights his military achievements, his connection with the Royal Ulster Rifles and his love of Ballycarry.
- Robbie Millar, a Michelin Star chef, was from Ballycarry.
