= Antynanum =

Townland in County Antrim, Northern Ireland

Coordinates: 54°55′53″N 6°02′15″W

- Location within Northern Ireland
- County: County Antrim
- Country: Northern Ireland
- Sovereign state: United Kingdom
- Police: Northern Ireland
- Fire: Northern Ireland
- Ambulance: Northern Ireland

Antynanum is a townland in County Antrim, Northern Ireland. 11 miles (18 km) north-east of Ballymena, it is in the historic barony of Antrim Lower and the civil parish of Racavan. It covers an area of 450 acres (180 ha).

The name derives from the Irish: An Tidh na nama (The church of the soul).

The population of the townland increased during the 19th century:

Year	1841	1851	1861	1871	1881	1891
Population	41	51	53	64	56	56
Houses	9	12	13	14	12	17

The townland contains a Scheduled Historic Monument: a court tomb (grid ref: D2556 1094). The Neolithic court tomb is set in a cairn 60–70 metres long running east–west and 3 metres tall at the west end. The semicircular court, at the west end, leads into a 7 metre long two-chambered gallery. The burial chambers are largely filled with cairn material. At the east end of the cairn is a single-chambered tomb with portal and displaced capstone.

== See also ==
- List of townlands in County Antrim
- List of archaeological sites in County Antrim
