= Swan Island, County Antrim =

Island in Northern Ireland

Coordinates: 54.82412°N 5.78497°W

Swan Island is an island measuring 0.1 ha within the Larne Lough Area of Special Scientific Interest (ASSI) near Larne, Northern Ireland. The island is formed by stabilising shingle, gravel and stones overlain by a thin layer of soil. It is sited 550 m from the west shore of the lough and 3.1 km from the mouth. The ASSI is also an SPA (Special Protection Area) because it regularly supports internationally important numbers of light-bellied brent geese in winter.

Swan Island, which was classified as an SPA in its own right in 1992, qualifies because, in summer, it supports nationally important breeding populations of rosate and common terns.

The nationally rare plant bur chervil can also be found in significant abundance on Swan Island. Small numbers of both Sandwich and Arctic terns also breed at this site.
