= Magheramorne =

Village in County Antrim, Northern Ireland

Coordinates: 54°49′N 5°46′W

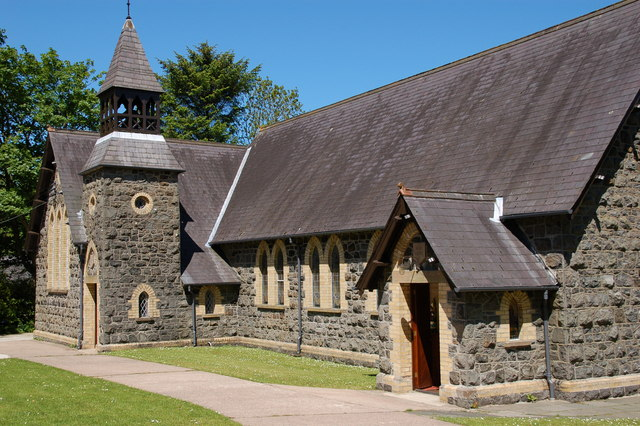
Magheramorne Presbyterian Church

Magheramorne (from Irish Machaire Morna - meaning 'Plain of Morna') is a small village in County Antrim, Northern Ireland. It is about 5 miles south of Larne on the shores of Larne Lough. It had a population of 228 people in the 2021 census. Following the reform of Northern Ireland's local government system on 1 April 2015, Magheramorne lies within the Mid and East Antrim Borough Council area.

== Industry ==
Nearby is an old limestone quarry owned by Lafarge (formerly known as Blue Circle). Extraction of limestone from the quarry, for use in the Magheramorne cement plant, ceased in 1980. The high point for limestone extraction at Magheramorne was in the 19th and 20th centuries. In the 19th century, a mission church for labourers at the limeworks was established and became a Presbyterian church.

In September 2009, Lafarge obtained outline planning permission for redevelopment of the quarry and cement works, including a new eco-friendly village and a cycling centre mainly in the quarry.

A regeneration plan was proposed to transform the quarry into a nature conservation, leisure and housing area. If the plans go ahead, the 75 hectare quarry would be home to a World Cycling Centre and the All-Ireland Scuba Diving Centre.

The area of Larne Lough, that was used to ship cement out of Magheramorne, is now used as an anchorage for the Blue Circle Boat Club which has a social club in the grounds. The factory area is now desolate and crumbling and private property with no public access.

== Game of Thrones ==
The abandoned Magheramorne quarry area was used as a filming location for the HBO TV series Game of Thrones. Castle Black, Hardhome and The Wall were filmed there, and battlements were built there to serve as King's Landing's defences during the Battle of Blackwater Bay; scenes shot atop the wall were filmed inside the Paint Hall Studios in Belfast.

The composite set (with both exteriors and interiors) consisted of a large section of Castle Black including the courtyard, the ravenry, the mess hall and the barracks, and used the stone wall of the quarry as the basis for the ice wall that protects Westeros. A functional elevator was built to lift the rangers to the top of The Wall. A castle with real rooms and a working elevator were built near a cliff 400 feet (120 m) high, CGI fills in the rest to make the wall appear 700 feet (210 m) high.

The area around the elevator was painted white to make it look like ice. George R. R. Martin said: "It's a pretty spectacular, yet miserable location. It is wet and rainy, and the mud is thick. I visited there; it really gets the actors in the mood of being at the end of the world in all of this cold and damp and chill".

== Transport ==
Magheramorne railway station was opened on 1 October 1862.

== Culture ==
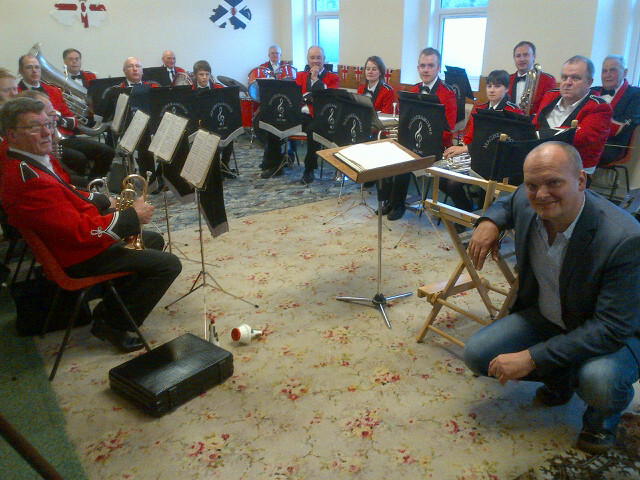
Magheramorne Silver Band with BBC's Ralph McLean

The area is home to the Magheramorne Silver Band, established in 1882 by a local Orange Lodge. Other local organisations include the Magheramorne Presbyterian Church and its associated groups for women and children. Several Loyal Orders are based in Magheramorne also.

== Sport ==
The local association football (soccer) club, Newington Rangers F.C., plays in the Northern Amateur Football League.

== People ==
- Saint Comgall, founder of Bangor Abbey in County Down, was born at Magheramorne in the 6th century.
- Hugh Nelson (Canadian politician), former Lieutenant Governor of British Columbia, was born at Magheramorne in 1830.
