= Aghalislone =

Townland in County Antrim, Northern Ireland

Coordinates: 54.537097°N 6.071053°W

Aghalislone: Irish: Achadh Lis Luain
- County: County Antrim
- Country: Northern Ireland
- Sovereign state: United Kingdom
- Police: Northern Ireland
- Fire: Northern Ireland
- Ambulance: Northern Ireland

Aghalislone (from Irish Achadh Lis Luain, meaning 'field of Loan's fort') is a townland of 664 acres in County Antrim, Northern Ireland. It is situated in the civil parish of Derriaghy and is split between the historic Baronies of Massereene Upper (426 acres) and Belfast Upper (238 acres). It is 7 miles (11 km) south-west of Belfast city centre.

== Archaeology ==
The townland contains two Scheduled Historic Monuments: a Rath (grid ref: J2599 6792) and a Barrow (grid ref: J2549 6825). In the course of house construction close to the rath in 2006, sherds of medieval and post-medieval pottery were found in a spoilheap on the site. In similar circumstances, numerous fragments of burnt flint and a flint core (suggesting Bronze Age activity in the area) and fragments of 19th glazed ceramics, were found on a building site close to the barrow in 2007.

== See also ==
- List of townlands in County Antrim
- List of archaeological sites in County Antrim
