= Ballycarry railway station =

Railway station in Northern Ireland

Ballycarry
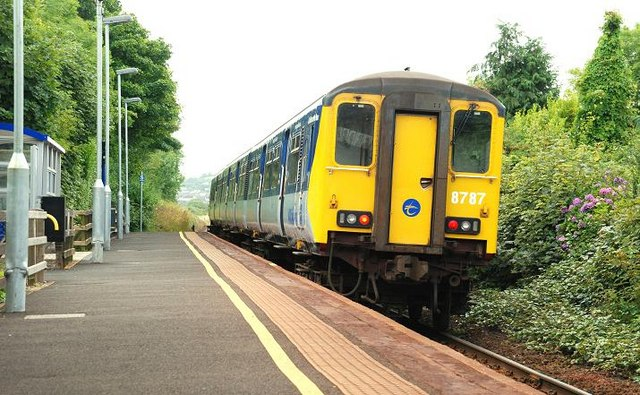
- NIR Class 450 train at Ballycarry station

General information
- Location: Ballycarry; Northern Ireland, United Kingdom
- Coordinates: 54.777°N 5.726°W
- Owner: NI Railways
- Operator: NI Railways
- Line: Larne
- Platforms: 1
- Tracks: 1

Construction
- Structure type: At-grade

Other information
- Station code: BC

Key dates
- 1862: Station opened
- 2008: Station refurbished

Passengers
- 2022/23: 24,423
- 2023/24: ▲27,489
- 2024/25: ▼25,791
- 2025/26: ▲26,173
- NI Railways; Translink; NI railway stations
Route map
(Click to expand)
Location
- Location within Northern Ireland Location within island of Ireland

Ballycarry railway station serves Ballycarry and Islandmagee in County Antrim, Northern Ireland, the station was opened on 1 October 1862.

Today there is just a single platform, there is a stationmaster's old cottage on a disused platform, this is now privately owned.

== Service ==
Mondays to Saturdays there is an hourly service towards Larne Harbour or Belfast Grand Central with extra services at peak times. On Sundays there is a service every two hours in either direction to Larne Harbour or Belfast Grand Central

Preceding station	NI Railways	Following station
Whitehead	Northern Ireland Railways; Belfast-Larne	Magheramorne
	Historical railways	
Whitehead; Line and station open	Northern Counties Committee; Belfast-Larne	Magheramorne; Line and station open

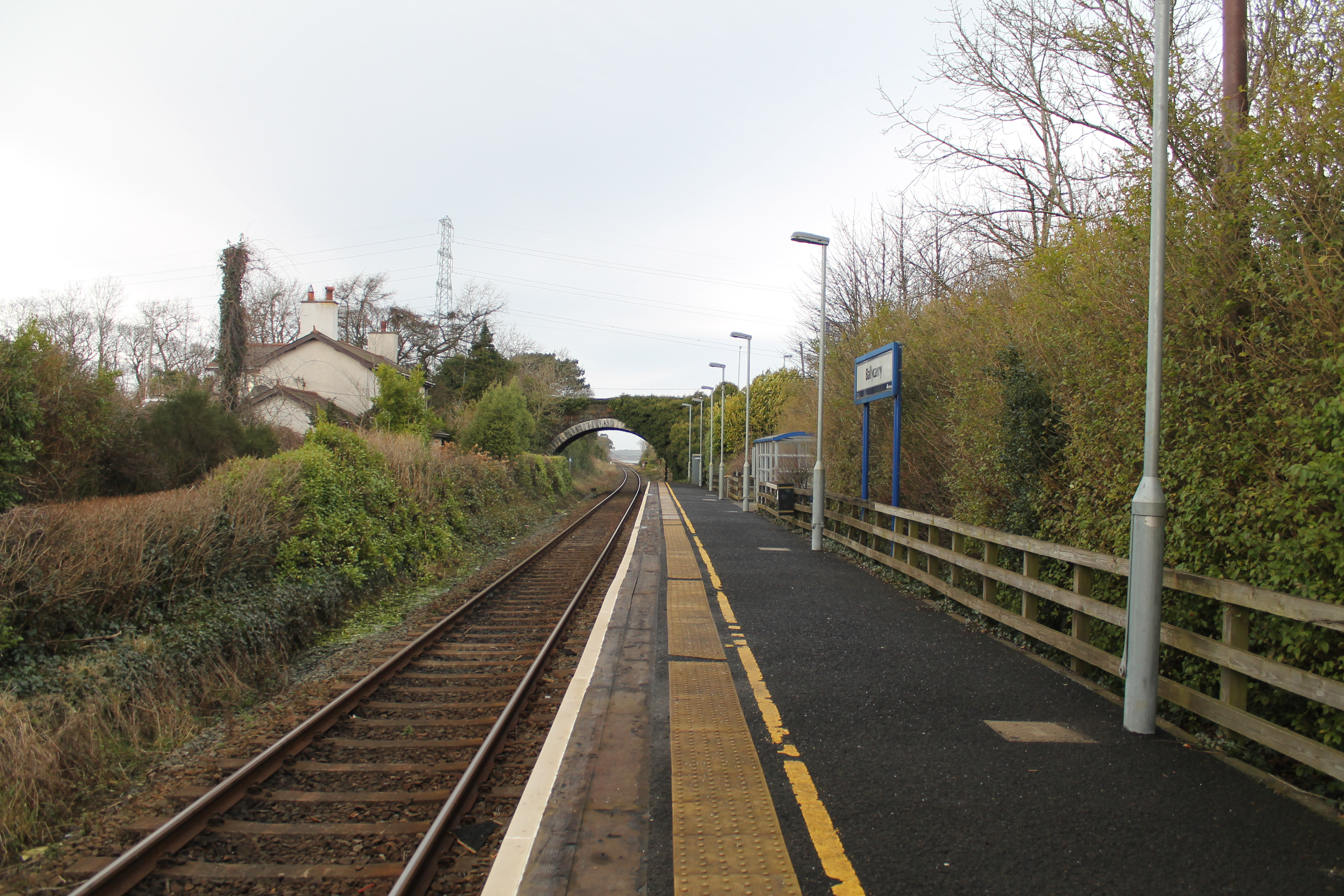
