= Craigs Dolmen =

Megalithic tomb in County Antrim, Northern Ireland

Coordinates: 54°59′36.90″N 6°28′42.76″W

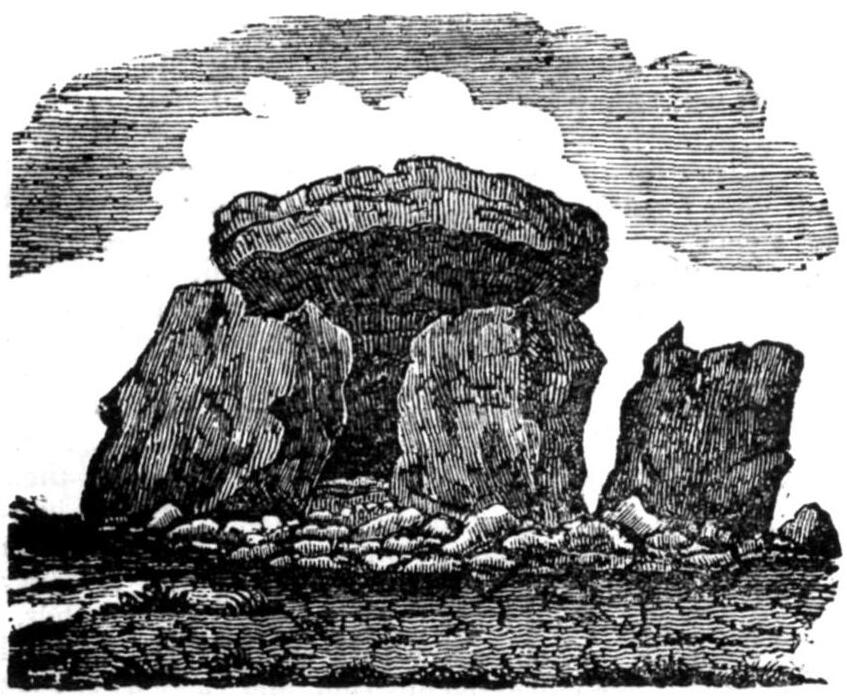
The Broad Stone, Parish of Finvoy, County of Antrim, Dublin Penny Journal, 1834

Craigs Dolmen (also known as the Broad Stone) is a megalithic tomb in County Antrim, Northern Ireland. It is 5 mi (8 km) south of Ballymoney, off Finvoy Road, at a height of 200m on the Long Mountain. Craigs Dolmen passage tomb is a State Care Historic Monument in the townland of Craigs, in Borough of Ballymoney. Its grid reference is C9740 1729.

== Features ==
It features a big capstone on seven upright stones and is wrongly assumed to be a dolmen, actually being a passage tomb. Lightning broke the capstone in 1976. It was restored in 1985, and excavation revealed that the chamber was the remnants of a passage tomb at the time. It was most likely erected before 2000 BC, although it was re-used for burial throughout the Bronze Age.

The large capstone over the entrance and the first chamber of this 3-chambered tomb was re-erected using an upright stone at the rear which probably was not an original feature. The almost semicircular forecourt faces south-east. The Broad Stone was only a popular place for meetings and assemblies.

== Nearby site ==
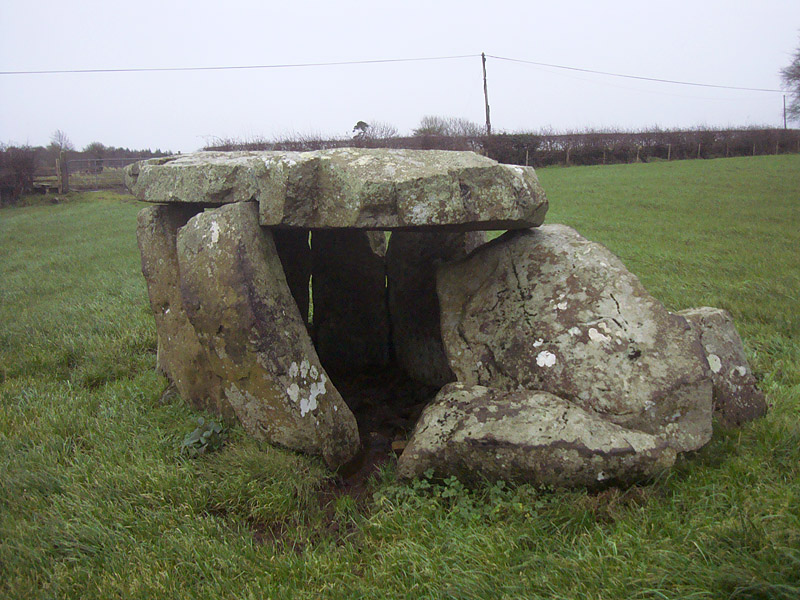
The smaller dolmen or portal tomb north of Craigs, Co. Antrim

On the other side of the road and 800m south-west is a small passage tomb. Seven close, tall uprights support a flat capstone measuring 210x160cm. On the south-west side, two fallen stones may be the remains of a short passage. No cairn survives.

== See also ==
- List of archaeological sites in County Antrim
