= Glynn railway station =

Railway station in Northern Ireland

Glynn
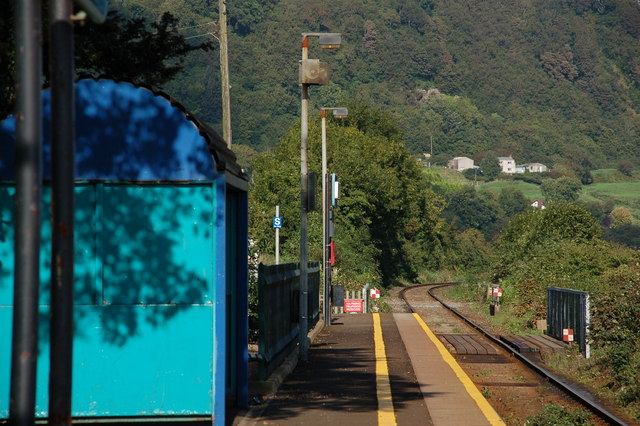
- Glynn halt in 2006

General information
- Location: Glynn; Northern Ireland
- Coordinates: 54°49′37″N 5°48′27″W
- Owner: NI Railways
- Operator: NI Railways
- Line: Larne
- Platforms: 1
- Tracks: 1

Construction
- Structure type: At-grade

Other information
- Station code: GN

Key dates
- 1864: Station opened
- 1933: Goods traffic stopped
- 2008: Station refurbished

Passengers
- 2022/23: 9,648
- 2023/24: ▲12,026
- 2024/25: ▼11,142
- 2025/26: ▲12,022
- NI Railways; Translink; NI railway stations
Route map
(Click to expand)
Location
- Location within Northern Ireland Location within island of Ireland

Glynn railway station serves Glynn in County Antrim, Northern Ireland. The station opened on 1 January 1864.

== Service ==
Mondays to Saturdays there is an hourly service towards Larne Harbour or Belfast Grand Central. Some peak-time trains do not call at Glynn station.

On Sundays there is a service every two hours in either direction to Larne Harbour or Belfast Grand Central.

Preceding station	NI Railways	Following station
Magheramorne	Northern Ireland Railways; Belfast-Larne Line	Larne Town
	Historical railways	
Magheramorne; Line and station open	Northern Counties Committee; Belfast-Larne	Larne Town; Line and station open
