= Porcellanite =

Dense chert (rock)

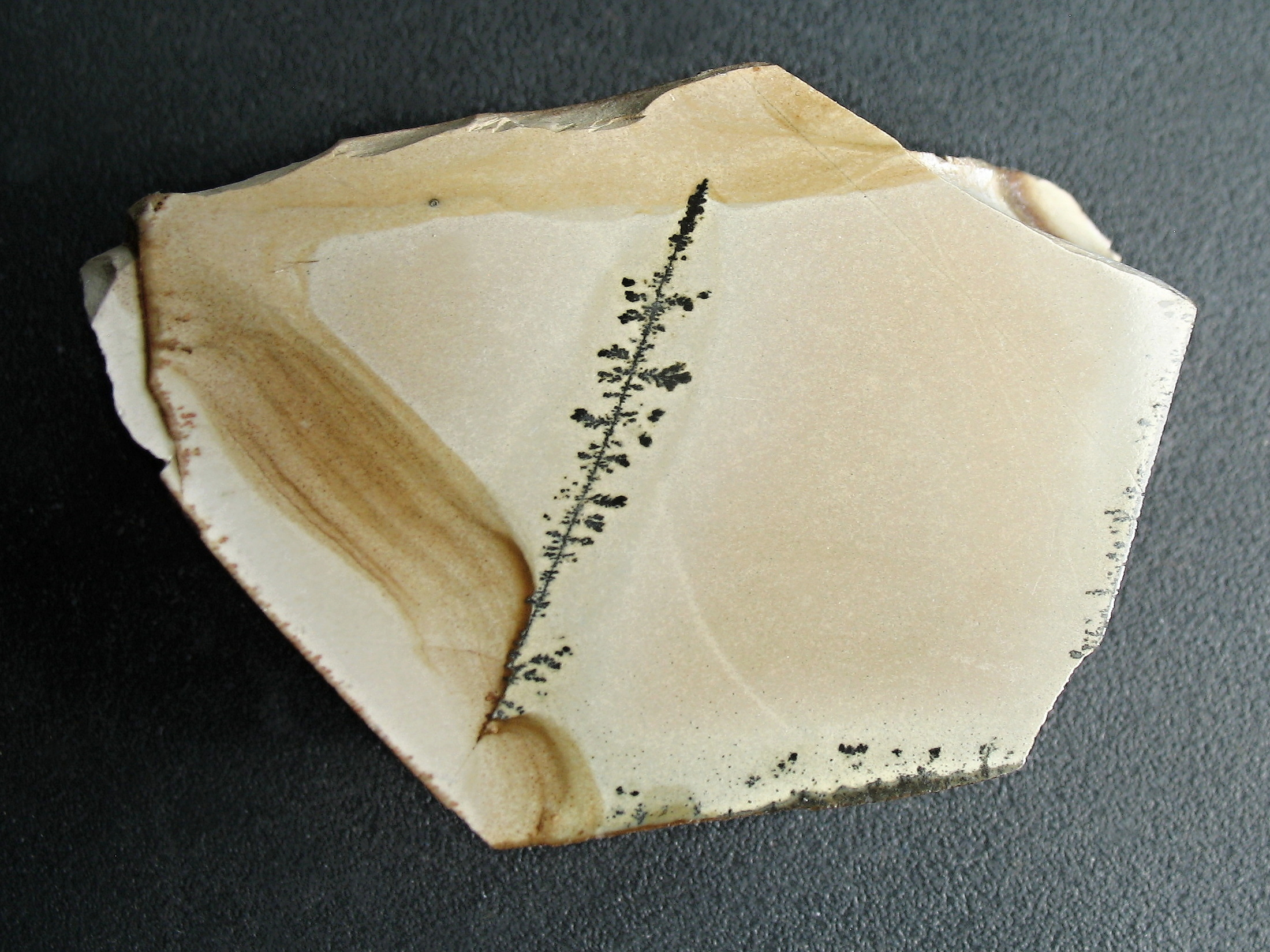
Porcellanite from the Czech Republic

Porcellanite or porcelanite, is a hard, dense rock somewhat similar in appearance to unglazed porcelain. It is often an impure variety of chert containing clay and calcareous matter.

Locations where Porcellanite has been found include Northern Ireland, Poland and the Czech Republic. Porcellanite is also commonly found in the Northern Territory of Australia. There, it comes in a variety of colours, primarily white, yellow, red and purple.

== Tievebulliagh ==
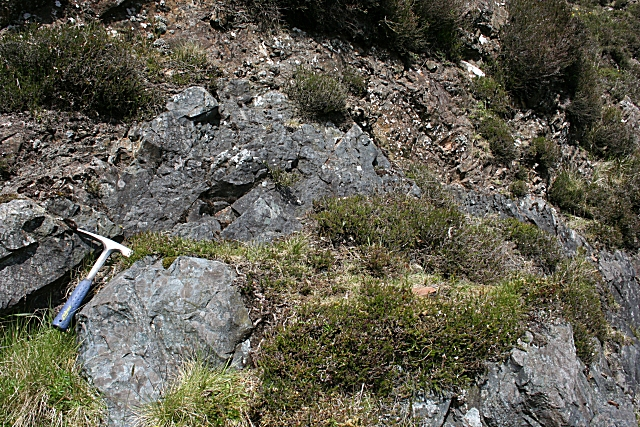
Porcellanite layer is the black rock above the hammer, and below the brown layer higher up the slope at Tievebulliagh

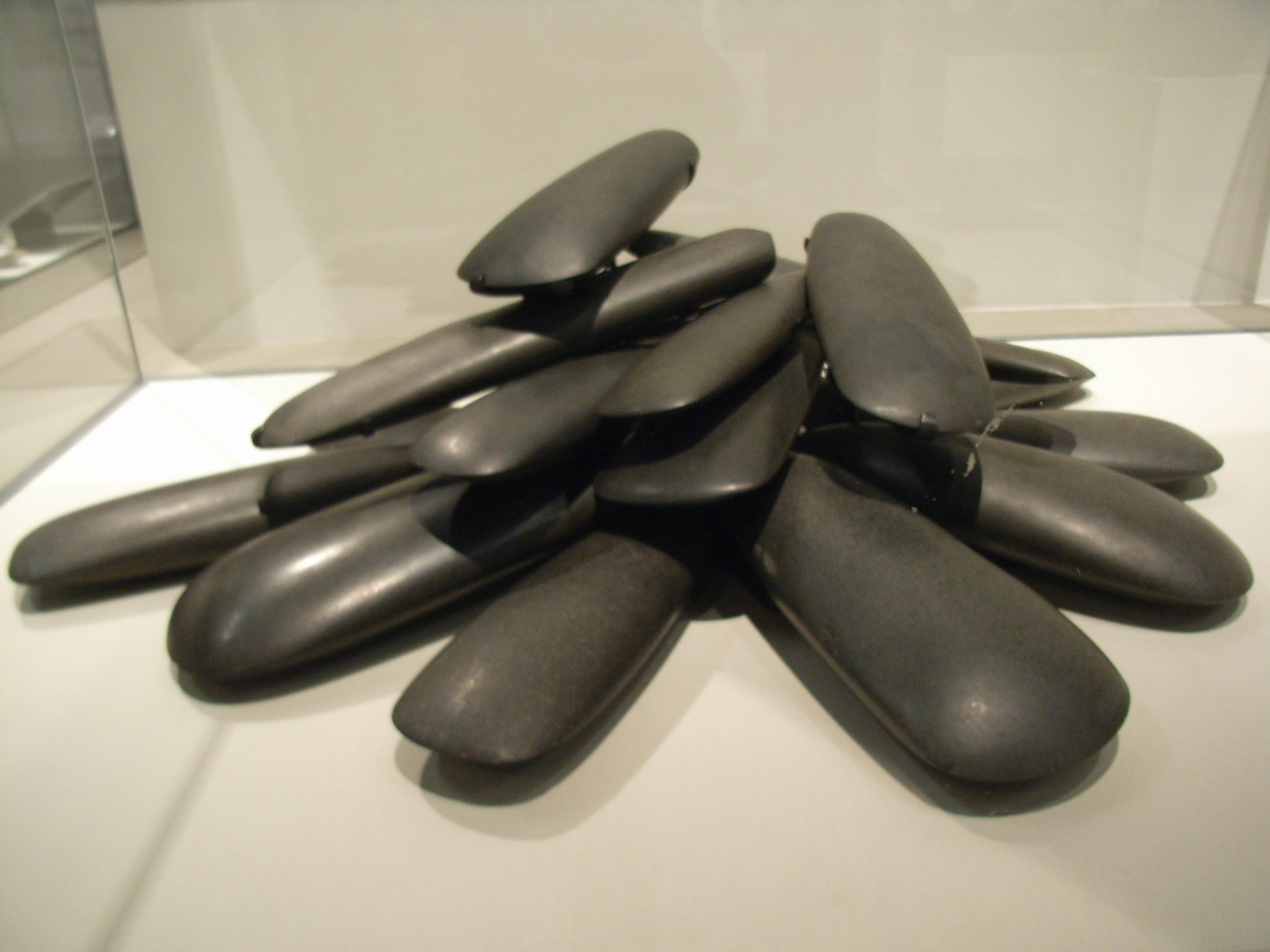
Porcellanite worked into Neolithic axes, Northern Ireland

At Tievebulliagh, Northern Ireland, porcellanite is a tough contact metamorphosed hornfels formed from a lateritic soil horizon within a basaltic intrusive/extrusive sequence. The rock is black to dark grey in colour.

Tievebulliagh is the site of a Neolithic axe or stone tool quarry, and there is another quarry on Rathlin Island. It is likely that roughouts or roughly-shaped prehistoric tools (called celts) were chipped on site before transportation both within Ireland and over the Irish Sea to Britain. It is also likely that the final polish would have been performed near the site of use in cutting vegetation and trees. It was commonly polished on grooved blocks of hard sandstone.
