= Magheramorne railway station =

Railway station in Northern Ireland

Magheramorne
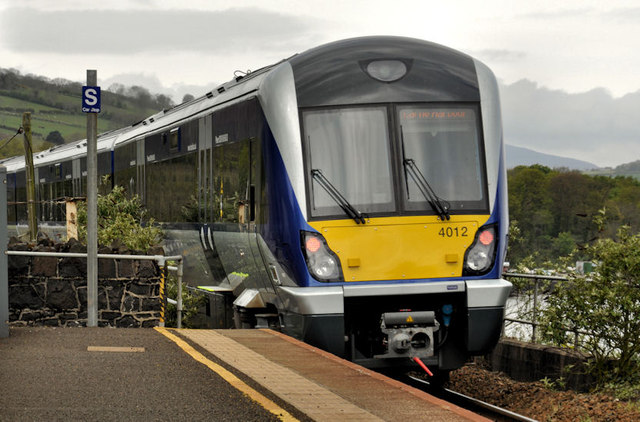
- NIR Class 4000 train at Magheramorne station.

General information
- Location: Magheramorne; Northern Ireland
- Coordinates: 54°48′56″N 5°46′0″W
- Owner: NI Railways
- Operator: NI Railways
- Line: Larne
- Platforms: 1

Construction
- Structure type: At-grade

Other information
- Station code: MM

Key dates
- 1862: Station opened
- 2008: Station refurbished

Passengers
- 2022/23: 8,279
- 2023/24: ▲10,098
- 2024/25: ▼9,575
- 2025/26: ▲10,311
- NI Railways; Translink; NI railway stations
Route map
(Click to expand)
Location
- Location within Northern Ireland Location within island of Ireland

Magheramorne railway station serves Magheramorne in County Antrim, Northern Ireland.

The station was opened on 1 October 1862. Originally it was the site for the loading of aggregate trains, with the last one running in the 1970s.

== Service ==
Mondays to Saturdays there is an hourly service towards Larne Harbour or Belfast Grand Central. Some peak-time services will skip over Magheramorne station.

On Sundays there is a service every two hours in either direction to Larne Harbour or Belfast Grand Central

Preceding station	NI Railways	Following station
Ballycarry	Northern Ireland Railways; Belfast-Larne Line	Glynn
	Historical railways	
Ballycarry; Line and station open	Northern Counties Committee; Belfast-Larne	Glynn; Line and station open
