= Tievebulliagh =

Mountain in Northern Ireland

Coordinates: 55.07419°N 6.13302°W

Tievebulliagh (Taobh Builleach)
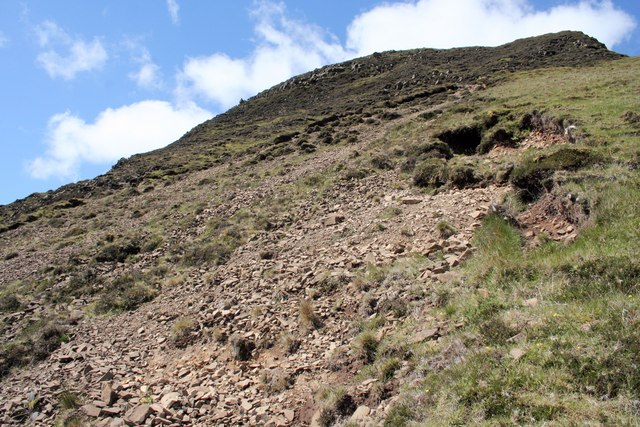
- Tievebulliagh, May 2007. Fragments of porcellanite can be seen among the dolerite in the scree.

Highest point
- Elevation: 402 m (1,319 ft)
- Prominence: c. 52 m
- Listing: Marilyn

Geography
- Location: County Antrim, Northern Ireland
- Parent range: Antrim Plateau, Glens of Antrim
- OSI/OSNI grid: D193268
- Topo map: OSNI Discoverer D5

Tievebulliagh (from Irish Taobh Builleach) is a 402-metre-high (1,319 ft) mountain in the Glens of Antrim, Northern Ireland. It forms part of the watershed between Glenaan to the north and Glenballyemon to the south. It is situated about 4.4 km from Cushendall.

== Geology ==
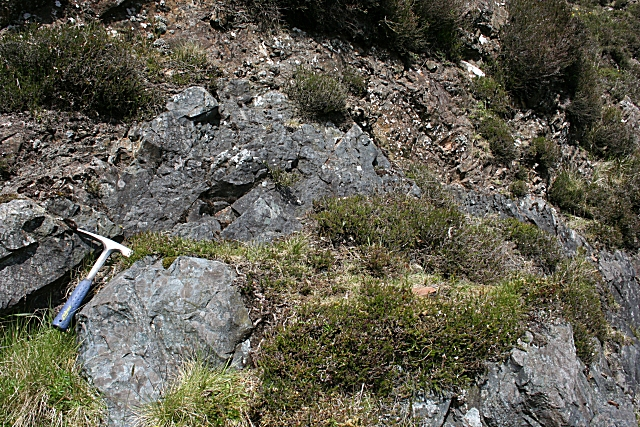
Porcellanite layer is the black rock above the hammer, and below the brown layer higher up the slope at Tievebulliagh

Tievebulliagh is formed from a volcanic plug, the intense heat generated by molten basalt has given rise to the formation of a durable flint, porcellanite, which is found at the foot of the eastern scree slope of the mountain. Three small outcrops of porcellanite can be seen on the higher south-east slope.

== Archaeology ==
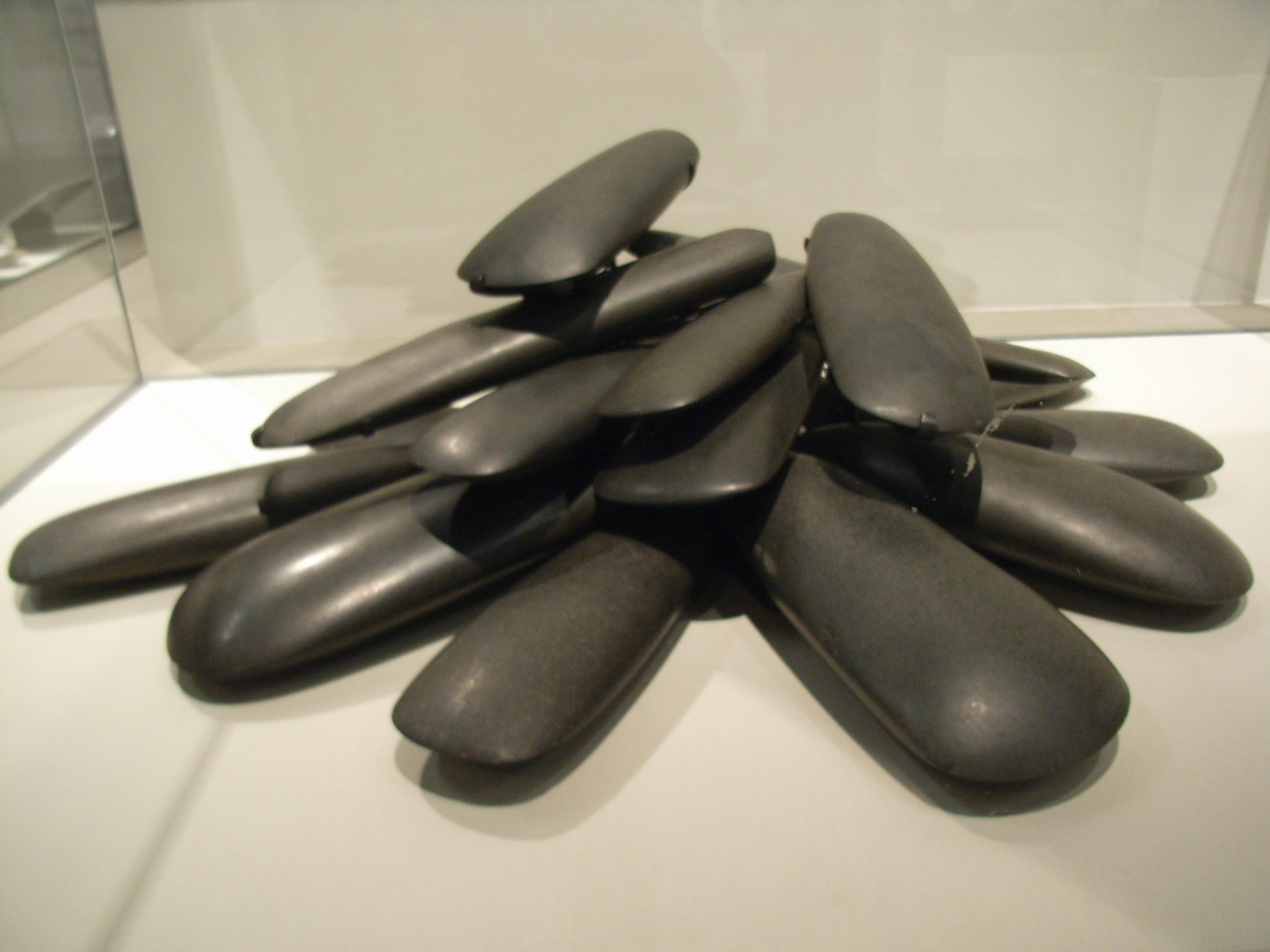
The Malone hoard of polished axes made from material from Tievebulliagh or Rathlin Island

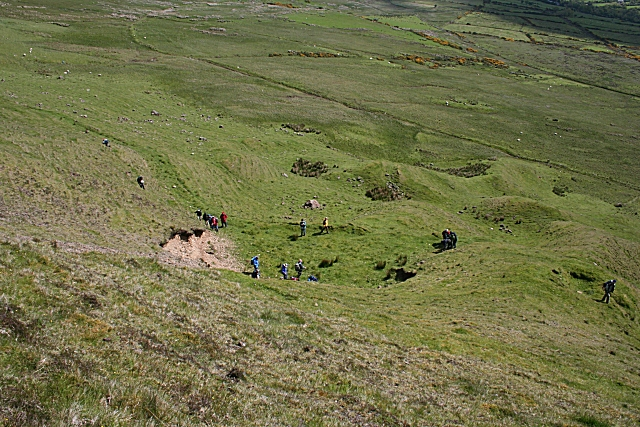
view of the hillocks at the base of the mountain

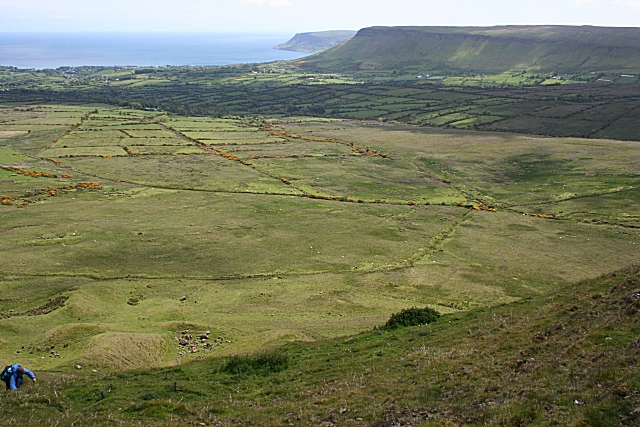
View from the peak of the mountain

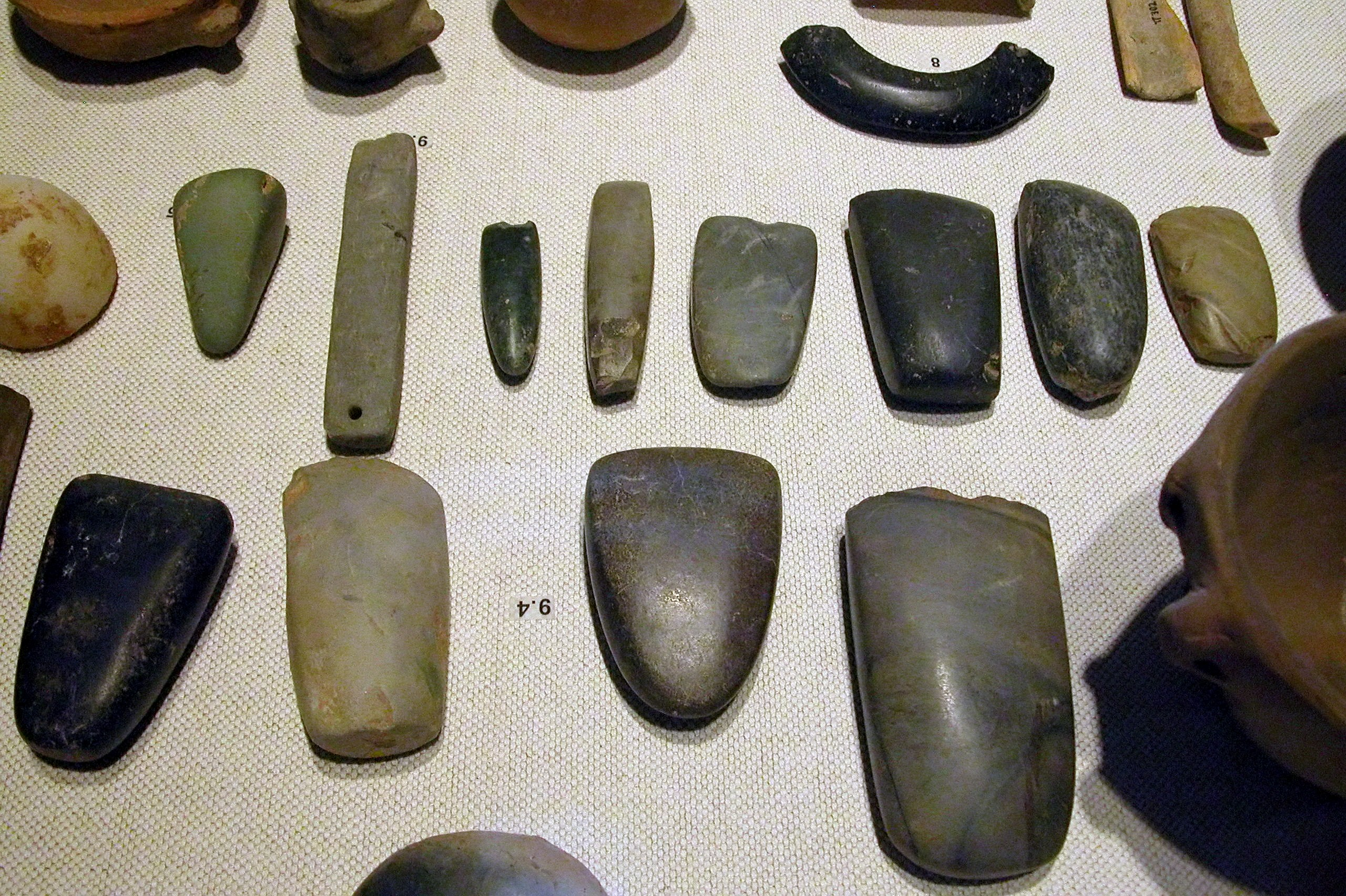
An array of Neolithic artifacts, including bracelets, axe heads, chisels, and polishing tools.

Evidence has been discovered of a Neolithic axe quarry at the foot of Tievebulliagh. Flint axe heads fashioned from porcellanite that originate from this quarry have been found across the British Isles, from the Outer Hebrides to the south coast of England and across the rest of Ireland. The site compares with the Langdale axe industry based in the English Lake District and the quarries at Penmaenmawr in North Wales, where large numbers of stone axes were manufactured.

Flakes, rejects and part-finished axes have been found round the hill and peak. It was here that the axes were roughed out before being finished at the sea shore. They were then exported as far afield as south-west Ireland, south-east England and north-east Scotland. No finished axes have been found at the site itself.

The "Malone Hoard", consisting of 19 polished stone axes from porcellanite Tievebulliagh or similar material from Brockley on Rathlin Island, was found at Danesfort house, on the Malone Road, Belfast. Some of the axes were inserted upright in the ground. The axes may be too big and heavy for practical use, so perhaps were meant to be used for ceremonial purposes. They are currently held in the Ulster Museum in Belfast.

There is a Bronze Age cairn on the mountain top. The round cairn and Neolithic axe factory on Tievebulliagh are Scheduled Historic Monuments sited in the townland of Cloghs, in Moyle District Council area, at grid ref: area of D193 266. There are numerous Neolithic and Bronze Age monuments in the vicinity in County Antrim, and include stone circles, long barrows and stone rows.

== See also ==
- List of archaeological sites in County Antrim
- List of hoards in Ireland
- Glens of Antrim
