= Ballylumford Power Station =

Gas-fired power station in Northern Ireland

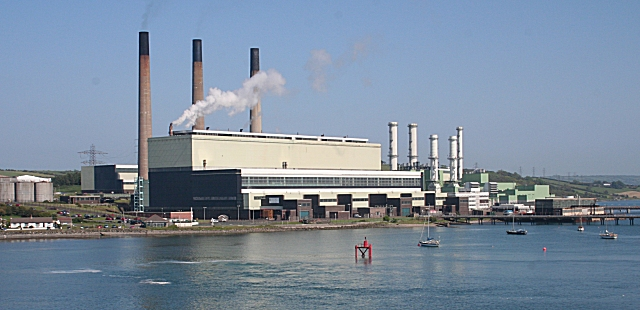
- The two power stations as viewed from the Whiteabbey to Larne Railway Line.
- Country: Northern Ireland, UK
- Coordinates: 54.845°N 5.787°W
- Status: Operational
- Commission date: 1943
- Owner: EP UK Investments
- Operator: EP UK Investments

Thermal power station
- Primary fuel: Natural gas

Power generation
- Nameplate capacity: 693 MW

External links
- Website: https://www.epuki.co.uk/
- Commons: Related media on Commons

Ballylumford power station "C" station is a natural-gas-fired power station in County Antrim, Northern Ireland, UK. With its main plant generating almost 700 megawatts of electricity, it is Northern Ireland's largest power station and provides half its power. Overall the station can produce 693 MW. The plant is located at the tip of the Islandmagee peninsula, which separates Larne Lough from the Irish Sea. The lough is a Site of Special Scientific Interest. The 3 chimneys of the now decommissioned "B" station are 126 metres tall. East of the station is the Ballycronan More converter station, the Northern Ireland end of the Moyle Interconnector, a subsea HVDC interconnector connecting the NI electricity system to Great Britain.

== History ==
The first Ballylumford power station, the "A" station, was commissioned in 1943.

It was a coal-fired generating station with an initial capacity of 30 MW. Further equipment was installed to increase the capacity by 31.5 MW (June 1945), another 31.5 MW (November 1948), and 31.5 MW (January 1951). By 1958 the generating capacity was 124.5 MW. The plant comprised:

- 2 Babcock & Wilcox coal-fired boilers, 220 psi, 800 °F (15.2 bar, 427 °C),
- 3 Babcock & Wilcox coal-fired high head boilers, 625 psi, 835 °F (43.1 bar, 446 °C),
- 4 Mitchell tri-drum coal-fired boilers 625 psi, 835 °F (43.1 bar, 446 °C)

Each boiler had a steam capacity of 150,000 lb/hr (18.9 kg/s). The boilers fed steam to four turbo-alternators:

- One 30 MW Metropolitan-Vickers 33 kV turbo-alternator
- One 31.5 MW Metropolitan-Vickers 33 kV turbo-alternator
- Two 30 MW Parsons 33 kV turbo-alternators

Condenser cooling water, 6.09 million gallons per hour (7.69 m^{3}/s) was drawn from the sea.

The growth in electricity supply in the mid-1950s is demonstrated in the table.

Ballylumford electricity supply statistics
Year (ended 31 March)	Consumers	Electricity sold, GWh	Revenue from sales, £
1953	126,235	335.302	2,463,854
1954	134,716	385.798	2,820,244
1955	144,230	422.366	3,128,240
1956	152,882	465.441	3,731,991
1957	160,025	510.961	4,401,370

The "A" station operated until 1974, when the "B" station was completed. The "B" station when complete had three 120 MW, and three 200 MW oil-fired generators, for an installed capacity of 960 MW.

The station was a key factor in the 1974 Ulster Workers' Council strike. Supplying all of Belfast and most of the eastern half of the province, Northern Ireland was effectively brought to a standstill when the mainly Protestant workers of the plant were persuaded to join the strike. The closure of the plant together with the wider strike resulted in the collapse of the Sunningdale Agreement.

In 1991 the nationalised power company, Northern Ireland Electricity, was incorporated as a government owned public limited company. In 1992 the four power stations at Belfast Harbour, Ballylumford, Derry (Coolkeeragh) and Carrickfergus (Kilroot) were demerged and sold. In 1993 the remainder of NIE (transmission, supply and retail businesses) was privatised as Northern Ireland Electricity plc.

In 1992 the supply of electricity in Northern Ireland was privatised. As a result, Northern Ireland Electricity sold the Ballylumford site to Premier Power, a subsidiary of British Gas. A condition of the sale was that the plant must be converted from heavy oil to gas-fired. British Gas formed Premier Transco Ltd. to build a submarine interconnector, the Scotland-Northern Ireland pipeline (SNIP), a 135 km pipe (40.4 km under sea) with a diameter of 0.61 m. Construction lasted three years (1994-1996) and was completed on time and on budget. Ballylumford converted to natural gas in 1996. To take advantage of this investment a licence was tendered to provide natural gas to Belfast, a tender which British Gas won through its subsidiary Phoenix Natural Gas.

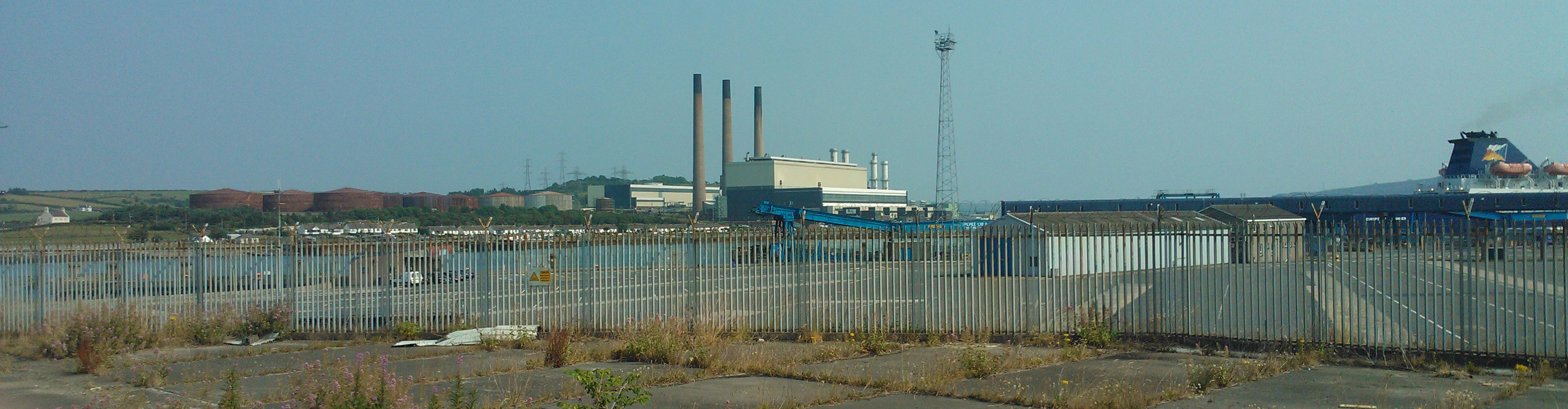
Ballylumford Power Station as seen from the Port of Larne. Large disused oil storage tanks can be seen on the left hand side.

In 2000 work began on the site's newest facility, a combined cycle gas turbine (CCGT), which has greatly increased efficiency and reduced pollution.

The new power block, called "C" Station entered commercial operation in 2003 and comprises steam turbines and gas turbines that can operate both in open cycle and in combined cycle. The gas turbines burn natural gas as the primary fuel but can also operate on low sulphur distillate liquid fuel (oil) if the gas fuel supply is interrupted. The electricity is generated at 15 and 18kV medium voltage and is increased to a higher 275/110kV level by step-up transformers to match the Northern Ireland Electricity (NIE) transmission system requirements. This high-voltage electricity is transferred by underground cables to existing outgoing feeder connections in an adjacent NIE switch house and then through the transmission system to the electricity users.

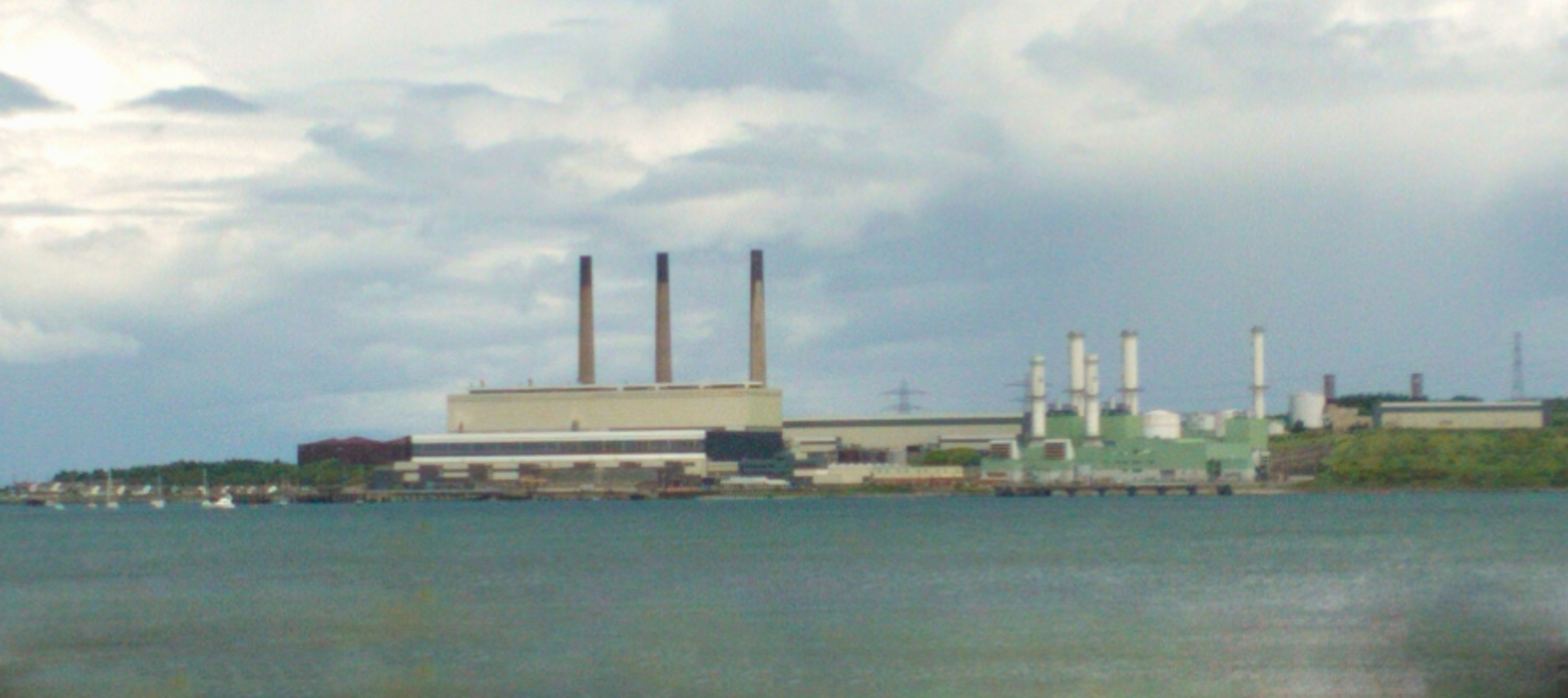
Ballylumford Power Station as seen from Glynn Railway Station. "C" Station can be seen on the right hand side.

On 12 August 2010, the AES Corporation announced that its subsidiary, AES Ballylumford Holdings Limited, had acquired Premier Power Limited (PPL) from BG Energy Holdings through an all-cash transaction for £102 million (approximately $160 million), which included purchase price and working capital adjustment. The transaction was announced on 2 July 2010, and was subject to licence consents from the Northern Ireland Authority for Utility Regulation and the Northern Ireland Department of Enterprise, Trade and Investment.

== 2018 and 2019 ==
In January 2018, Kilroot's failure to win a new contract under the Single Electricity Market for its two coal-fired generators, threatened its closure by May. Ballylumford was also affected, with the remaining B station units (3) being decommissioned that year with the potential loss of 30 jobs. Ultimately Kilroot was retained, but the "B" station (which had gradually decommissioned most of the six generators due to emissions requirements) finally closed in 2018.

In April 2019 AES Corporation has agreed to sell Ballylumford to EP UK Investments, a subsidiary of Energetický a průmyslový holding. The transaction was finalised in June 2019.

== See also ==
- Electricity sector in Ireland
