= Scotland–Northern Ireland pipeline =

Scotland to Northern Ireland Pipeline

Location
- Country: United Kingdom
- Direction: North to South
- Start: Twynholm, Scotland
- To: Ballylumford power station, Northern Ireland

General information
- Type: Natural gas
- Owner: Mutual Energy
- Contractors: European Marine Contractors (EMC)
- Commissioned: 1996

Technical information
- Length: 135 km (84 mi)
- Diameter: 609 mm (24 in)

The Scotland-Northern Ireland Pipeline (SNIP) is a 24 in (610 mm), 135 km (84 mi) long natural gas pipeline which runs from Twynholm, Scotland to Islandmagee in Northern Ireland. The SNIP is owned by Mutual Energy.

== Background ==
In March 1992 Northern Ireland Secretary Peter Brooke announced the first stage of the privatisation of Northern Ireland Electricity, the province's nationalised utility company; A major part of this was the sale of Ballylumford power station in Northern Ireland to British Gas for £132 million. This oil-fired power plant provided more than half of the power needs of the 600,000 customers in Northern Ireland. British Gas simultaneously announced its plans to set up Premier Transco to build and operate a natural gas pipeline between Scotland and Northern Ireland, to convert Ballylumford to natural gas, and to set up a commercial supply company for natural gas (what would become Phoenix Natural Gas).

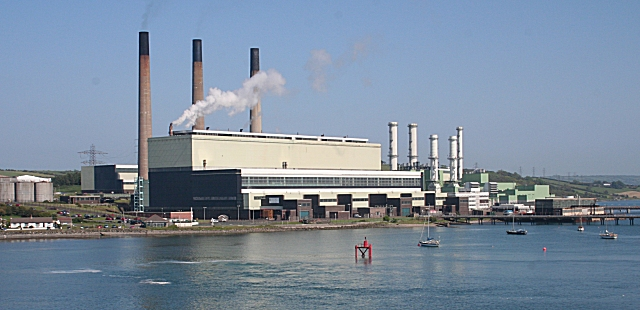
Ballylumford Power Station. The CCGT "C" station in the background is the biggest customer of SNIP gas.

== Construction ==
In 1994 Premier Transco awarded the contract for design and construction of the SNIP to European Marine Contractors (EMC), a 50-50 venture of Brown & Root Inc. and Saipem. Pipe production began in 1994 at the Hartlepool, England, plant of British Steel plc. EMC used the Castoro Sei semi-submersible laybarge to install the line. The pipeline was completed in 1996.

The route and construction of the pipeline were both controversial due to concerns of it disrupting a weapons dump in and around Beaufort's Dyke.

There are no accurate figures available from the UK Ministry of Defence for its disposal operations but it estimates that over a million tons of conventional weapons were disposed of between 1946 and 1963 with Beaufort's Dyke being the main site, just 25 miles off the coast of Larne. Sites off Donegal and the Cork/Kerry coast were also used after the second World War.

From Twynholm the pipeline is routed overland to Stranraer and then as a submarine pipeline to Ballylumford.

== Operation ==
The SNIP was commissioned in 1996. It is designated the Pipeline Number PL982 by the Oil & Gas Authority. The pipeline has a maximum operating pressure of 75 bar (1000 psi).

From Ballylumford power station Northern Ireland, the pipeline continues as the Belfast Gas Transmission Pipeline (BGTP) to Belfast via Carrickfergus. Then as the North-West Pipeline (NWP) to Coolkeeragh power station.

== See also ==
- United Kingdom–Ireland natural gas interconnectors
