= Phoenix Energy =

Northern Irish gas company

Phoenix Energy Group Limited
- Industry: Utilities
- Founded: September 1996
- Founder: British Gas plc
- Headquarters: Belfast, Northern Ireland
- Area served: Greater Belfast, Larne & East Down
- Key people: Michael McKinstry (CEO)
- Owner: Royal Bank of Scotland Group Pension Fund (50%), managed by Vantage Infrastructure; Utilities Trust of Australia (50%)
- Number of employees: 175
- Website: www.phoenixnaturalgas.com

Phoenix Energy (formerly Phoenix Natural Gas) is the largest gas distribution business in Northern Ireland, being the owner and operator of the licence for the distribution network in the Greater Belfast area. The distribution business is responsible for the development of the pipeline network and also for providing a 24/7 operational and transportation service platform to suppliers under the rules of the company's network code. The ongoing investment within the Phoenix Energy licence area does not attract any grant or support from local or UK government. The investment is a standalone private venture.

The Phoenix Energy network currently extends to over 3,650 kilometres of intermediate, medium and low-pressure mains, which distribute natural gas throughout the licence area, representing around 50% of the population of Northern Ireland. Approximately 70% of the gas infrastructure has been completed using trenchless 'No Dig' technology.

Phoenix Energy manages the construction, maintenance and operation of the network and is also responsible for the development of the market in Greater Belfast and Larne. Already some 218,000 customers have been connected to natural gas network in the 20 plus years it has been available to them. The business is regulated under licence by the Northern Ireland Authority for Utility Regulation (NIAUR).

== History ==
In March 1992 Northern Ireland Secretary Peter Brooke announced the first stage of the privatisation of Northern Ireland Electricity, the province's monopolistic utility company. A major part of this was the sale of Ballylumford power station in Northern Ireland to British Gas for £132 million. This oil-fired power plant provided more than half of the power needs of the 600,000 customers in Northern Ireland. British Gas simultaneously announced its plans to set up Premier Transco to build and operate the Scotland-Northern Ireland pipeline (SNIP), a natural gas pipeline, to convert Ballylumford to natural gas, and to set up a commercial supply company for natural gas (what would become Phoenix Natural Gas).

The £250 million Scotland Northern Ireland Pipeline (SNIP) was completed in 1996, with the first gas delivered through it in September of that year. In 1997 BG Group sold a 24.5% stake in Phoenix to KeySpan. In early 2001 BG Group sold a further 24.5% to East Surrey Holdings plc (ESH) for £50 million. In November 2003 ESH purchased Phoenix outright, acquiring the other two shareholders' stakes for a total of £177 million. Terra Firma Capital Partners completed a protracted acquisition of ESH and its Phoenix subsidiary for £453 million in 2005; Terra Firma had attempted to withdraw its bid for ESH due to a "bitter and long-running dispute with Northern Ireland's energy regulator Douglas McIldoon over Phoenix Natural Gas, which represents more than half of East Surrey's sales."

In 2008 Phoenix sold the Belfast Gas Transmission Pipeline system to Northern Ireland Energy Holdings for £99.3 million. The pipeline carries natural gas from the end of the SNIP to Larne, Carrickfergus and across Belfast Lough to Knocknagoney where it connects with Phoenix's network. Phoenix was obliged to sell the pipeline as part of a licensing agreement with NIAUR.

In May 2012 SSE plc's Airtricity subsidiary purchased Phoenix Supply Limited and Phoenix Energy Limited (its Republic of Ireland supply business) for £19.1 million.

Terra Firma sold Phoenix Natural Gas to Hastings Funds Management in 2013 for £700 million. Hastings Fund Management's international division, renamed Vantage Infrastructure in 2018, manages 50% of Phoenix Natural Gas on behalf of the RBS Group Pension Fund. The remaining 50% stake is owned by the Utilities Trust of Australia.

In December 2015 the Utility Regulator approved a licence extension for Phoenix Natural Gas to develop the natural gas network in 13 new towns in East Down including; Anahilt, Ballygowan, Ballynahinch, Castlewellan, Crossgar, Downpatrick, Dromore, Drumaness, Dundrum, Hillsborough, Newcastle, Saintfield and the Spa. The £60m private investment by the company sees natural gas being made available to an additional 28,000 properties in these areas. Construction commenced in early 2016 with Ballygowan being the first town to connect to the network, and will continue until an estimated completion date of 2022.

In May 2023, the company rebranded from Phoenix Natural Gas to Phoenix Energy. The rebrand was to reflect their plans to transition from natural gas to renewable gas solutions, such as hydrogen and biomethane.
