= Belfast Lower =

Belfast Lower Béal Feirste Íochtarach (Irish)
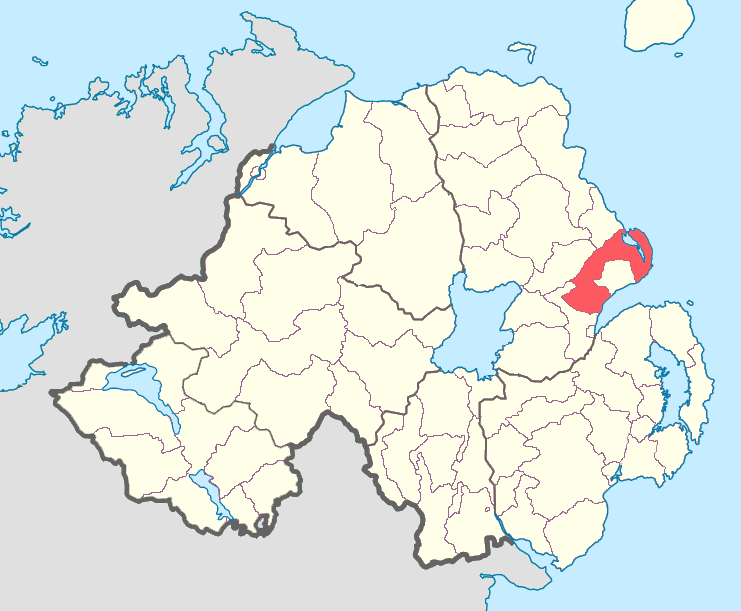
- Location of Belfast Lower, County Antrim, Northern Ireland
- Sovereign state: United Kingdom
- Country: Northern Ireland
- County: Antrim

Belfast Lower is a barony in County Antrim, Northern Ireland. To its east lies the east-Antrim coast and Belfast Lough, and it is bordered by four other baronies: Belfast Upper to the south, Carrickfergus to the east, Antrim Upper to the west; Glenarm Upper to the north. The Forth and Milewater rivers both flow through Belfast Lower, with Larne harbour also situated in the barony.

== Roughfort ==
Roughfort is a medieval motte located in the barony which was used as an assembly point for the United Irishmen who were under the command of Henry Joy McCracken prior to the Battle of Antrim on 7 June 1798. Thousands of Presbyterians from the surrounding area of the Six Mile Water valley rose up and fought in the battle. Opposite the motte is a Liberty Tree, an American tradition where revolutionary notices where pinned to a tree. Whilst Liberty Trees in Ireland were planted in 1798, it is speculated that the one at Roughfort may have been planted the following year.

== List of settlements ==
Below is a list of settlements in Belfast Lower:

=== Towns ===
- Ballyclare (split with barony of Antrim Upper)
- Newtownabbey
- Larne (Belfast Lower portion)

=== Villages ===
- Ballycarry
- Ballynure
- Ballyrobert
- Ballystrudder
- Glynn
- Whitehead

=== Population centres ===
- Browns Bay
- Magheramorne
- Mossley
- Straid
- Whitewell

== List of civil parishes ==
Below is a list of civil parishes in Belfast Lower:

- Ballylinny
- Ballymartin (split with barony of Belfast Upper)
- Ballynure
- Carnmoney
- Glynn
- Kilroot
- Inver
- Island Magee
- Raloo
- Shankill (split with barony of Belfast Upper)
- Templecorran
- Templepatrick (split with barony of Belfast Upper)
