= Islandmagee =

Coordinates: 54.79643°N 5.70304°W

Islandmagee: Irish: Oileán Mhic Aodha
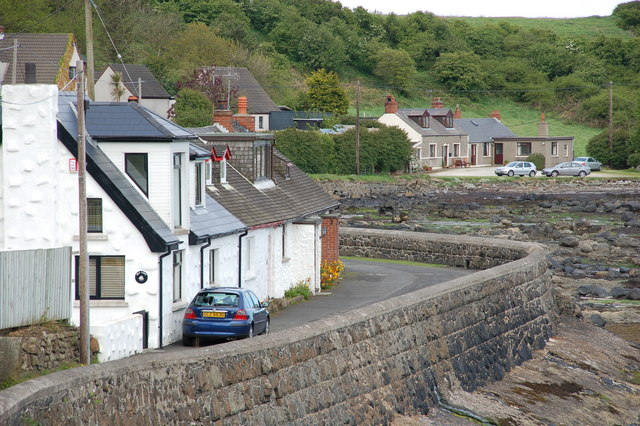
- Cottages near Browns Bay, Islandmagee, in 2006

- Location within Northern Ireland
  - Belfast: 18 mi (29 km)
- District: Mid and East Antrim
- County: County Antrim
- Country: Northern Ireland
- Sovereign state: United Kingdom
- Post town: LARNE
- Postcode district: BT40
- Dialling code: 028
- UK Parliament: East Antrim
- NI Assembly: East Antrim

Islandmagee (from Irish Oileán Mhic Aodha, meaning 'Magee’s island/peninsula') is a peninsula and civil parish on the east coast of County Antrim, Northern Ireland, located between the towns of Larne and Whitehead. It is part of the Mid and East Antrim Borough Council area and is a sparsely populated rural community with a history since the Mesolithic period. The population is approximately 2,500 (excluding the village of Whitehead). In the early medieval period it was known as Semne, a petty-kingdom within Ulaid.

It is the site of Northern Ireland's main power station Ballylumford and the endpoint of the Scotland-Northern Ireland gas pipeline.

== History ==
The name comes from Mac Aodha (Magee) a prominent Irish family in the area. An earlier Irish name was Rinn Seimhne (peninsula of (the district of) Seimhne) from an original tribal name. The Bissett family held the tenancy of the peninsula in Elizabeth I's reign (1558 - 1603), their rent being an annual offering of goshawks, birds which bred on the rugged white chalk cliffs nearby.

In November 1641, roughly a month after the outbreak of the Irish Rebellion of 1641, a number of Catholic civilians living in Islandmagee were killed by troops from the nearby garrison at Carrickfergus. Despite claims by an anonymous 17th-century author that the dead amounted to "above 3,000 men women and children", the true figure is now thought to have been two dozen. This is alleged to be the first massacre to take place during the rebellion and the War of the Three Kingdoms.

In 1711, the Islandmagee witch trial resulted in eight women being convicted of witchcraft and sentenced to a year's imprisonment. The last such trial to take place in Ireland, it is hoped to include these in a new historical tour. A local councillor objected it would be a 'shrine to paganism'. Others have said it should go ahead. One historian citing "It's a dark event in our history - but it happened. People are fascinated by what happened at the Islandmagee witch trials, and the council could get a lot more tourism value from their interest".

=== Archaeology ===
- Islandmagee is the home of the Ballylumford Dolmen. Known locally as the "Druid's Altar", this megalithic monument could date to 2500 BC (The Early Bronze Age), or be the remains of an earlier Neolithic simple passage tomb dating to c. 4000 BC. It consists of four upright stones, with a heavy capstone and a fallenstone within the structure. The fallenstone may have been put there to block the entrance to the tomb.
- Neolithic houses have been excavated at Ballyharry, on the Islandmagee peninsula. Finds included Neolithic pottery, flint arrowheads, javelin heads, polished stone axe fragments and quernstones.
- Dinosaur remains were found in the area in the 19th century and in the 20th century. These were the first find of dinosaur fossil bones ever found in Ireland.

== Gas storage project ==
The gas storage project, owned by famous ship building firm Harland & Wolff, will consist of seven caverns storing up to 500 million cubic meters of gas and is the only one in North West Europe to have 'Project of Common Interest' status from the European Union. The facility is expected to provide 25% of the UK's gas capacity when it is completed.

The project has been the subject of objections, citing "concerns of harm to dolphins, porpoise and whales". This caused the Environment Agency to extend the response time for consultation. In January 2022, the group "No Gas Caverns Islandmagee" confirmed that they have mounted a legal challenge against the project.

== Sport ==
- Islandmagee F.C. plays in the Northern Amateur Football League. Their home is Wilbourne Park.

== Civil parish of Island Magee ==
The peninsula is part of the parish of Island Magee. The boundaries of the parish and the peninsula match.

== Townlands ==
The civil parish contains the following townlands:

- Balloo
- Ballycronan Beg
- Ballycronan More
- Ballydown
- Ballyharry
- Ballykeel
- Ballylumford
- Ballymoney
- Ballymuldrogh
- Ballyprior Beg
- Ballyprior More
- Ballystrudder
- Ballytober
- Carnspindle
- Castletown
- Cloghfin
- Drumgurland
- Dundressan
- Gransha
- Kilcoan Beg
- Kilcoan More
- Mullaghboy
- Mullaghdoo
- Portmuck
- Temple-effin

== See also ==
- List of civil parishes of County Antrim
