= List of high-voltage transmission links in the United Kingdom =

The following is a list of high-voltage transmission links in the United Kingdom, including some under construction or proposed.

== The rise of UK interconnection ==
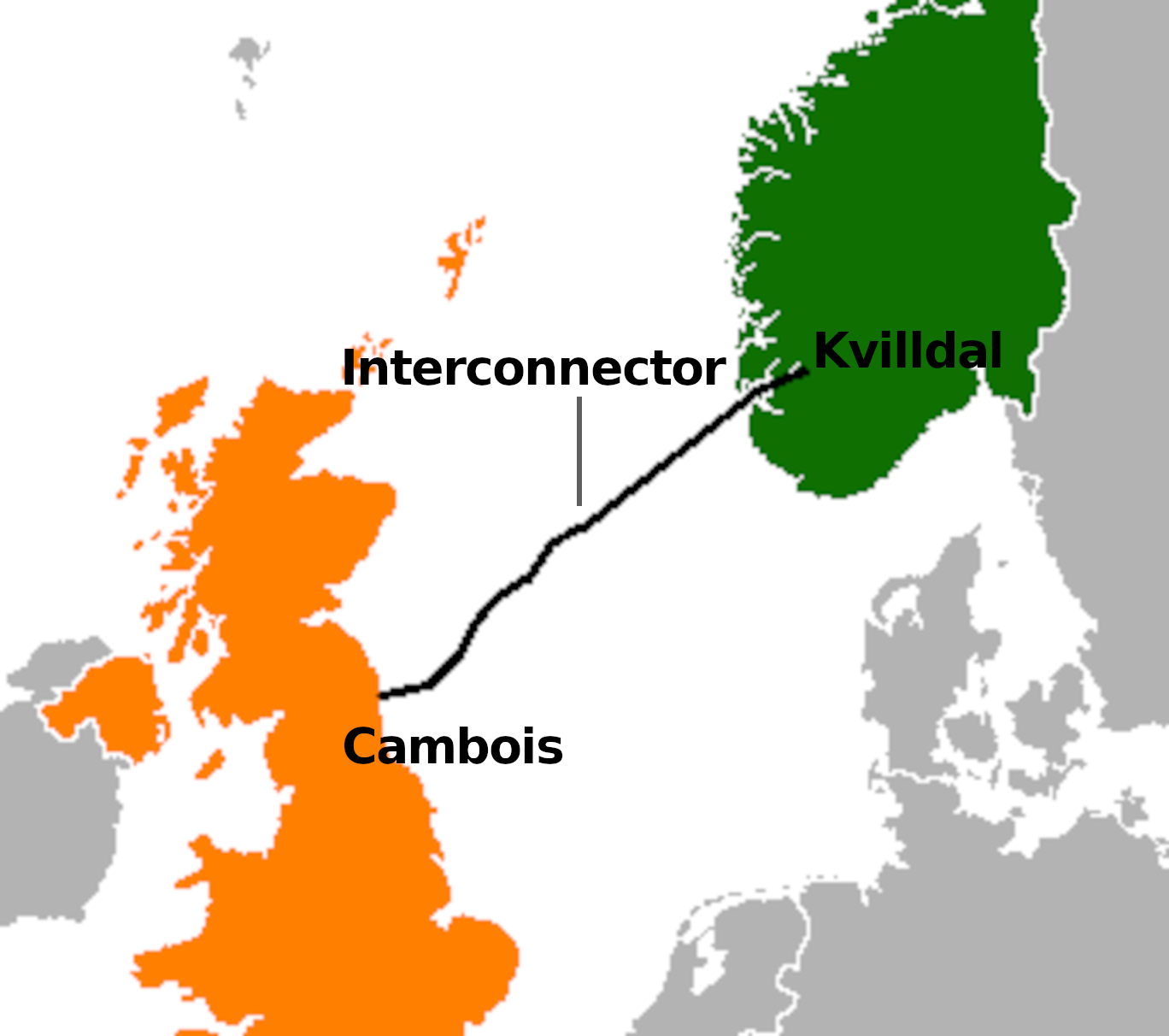
Map of the North Sea Link interconnector between Great Britain and Norway.

The Department for Energy Security and Net Zero's Digest of UK Energy Statistics reports that the UK was a net importer of electricity in 2024, with net imports of 33.4 TWh, up 40% from 2023.

Interconnectors allow the trade of electricity between countries with excess generation (for example, intermittent renewable) and those with high demand. Interconnectors play a key part in balancing variable renewable generation, for example the 1.4 GW North Sea Link allows the UK to export excess power to Norway during windy periods to conserve Norwegian hydro stocks, and import Norwegian hydro power on less windy days.

During the 2022 energy crisis, the UK exported record amounts of power to mainland Europe, helping to alleviate the effects of the Russian invasion of Ukraine on European security of supply.

As of 12 November 2024, Great Britain had nine operational international electricity interconnectors.

== International links ==
=== Operational ===
Name	Developers	Substation		Length (km)	Voltage (kV)	Power (MW)	Operational	Route
Name	Developers	UK	Non-UK	Length (km)	Voltage (kV)	Power (MW)	Operational	Route
IFA (HVDC Cross-Channel)	National Grid and RTE	(England) Sellindge, Kent	Bonningues-lès-Calais, France	73	±270	2,000	1986	Subsea cable
IFA-2	National Grid and RTE	(England) Lee-on-the-Solent, Hampshire	Tourbe, France	204	±320	1,000	2021	Subsea cable
ElecLink	Getlink	(England) Folkestone, Kent	Peuplingues, France	51	±320	1,000	2022	Channel Tunnel
BritNed	National Grid and TenneT	(England) Isle of Grain, Kent	Maasvlakte, Netherlands	260	±450	1,000	2011	Subsea cable
East–West Interconnector	EirGrid Interconnector Limited	(Wales) Shotton, Flintshire	(Republic of Ireland) Rush, County Dublin, Ireland	262	±200	500	2012	Subsea cable
Nemo Link	Nemo Link Limited (National Grid and Elia)	(England) Richborough, Kent	Zeebrugge, Belgium	140	±400	1,000	2019	Subsea cable
North Sea Link	National Grid and Statnett	(England) Blyth, Northumberland	Kvilldal, Norway	720	±515	1,400	2021	Subsea cable
Viking Link	National Grid and Energinet	(England) Bicker Fen, Lincolnshire	Revsing, Jutland, Denmark	765	±525	1,400	2023	Subsea cable
Greenlink	Element Power & Partners Group	(Wales) Pembroke, Pembrokeshire	(Republic of Ireland) Great Island, County Wexford, Ireland	190	±320	504	2025	Subsea cable
Total						9,804		

=== Under construction, approved, or recently cancelled ===
Name	Developers	Substation		Length (km)	Voltage (kV)	Power (MW)	Approval & status	Proposed opening	Type of HVDC
Name	Developers	UK	Non-UK	Length (km)	Voltage (kV)	Power (MW)	Approval & status	Proposed opening	Type of HVDC
NeuConnect	Meridiam, Allianz and Kansai Electric Power	(England) Isle of Grain, Kent	Wilhelmshaven, Lower Saxony, Germany	725	525	1,400	Ofgem approved and under construction	2028	Submarine
Nautilus	National Grid Ventures and Elia	(England) Isle of Grain, Kent	(Belgium) TBD	160	TBD	1,400	Ofgem approved	2028	Submarine
MaresConnect	Foresight Group and Etchea Energy	(Wales) Bodelwyddan, Denbighshire	(Republic of Ireland) Woodland, County Meath	245	320	750	Ofgem approved	2029	Submarine
FAB Link	RTE and FAB Link Limited	(England) Exeter Airport, Devon	(France) L'Étang-Bertrand (lieu-dit Menuel)	220	320	1,250	Ofgem approved	2030	Submarine
LionLink	National Grid Ventures and TenneT	(England) Walberswick, Suffolk	(Netherlands) TBD	TBD	TBD	1,800	Ofgem approved	2032	Submarine
Tarchon	Copenhagen Infrastructure Partners and Volta Partners	(England) Tendring, Essex	(Germany) Niederlangen	750	525	1,400	Ofgem approved	2034	Submarine
Atlantic SuperConnection	ASC Energy	(England) Creyke Beck, East Riding of Yorkshire	(Iceland) TBD	~1,700 to 1,800	TBD	1,800	Pending	2029	Submarine
Xlinks Morocco-UK Power Project	Xlinks Ltd	(England) Alverdiscott, Devon	(Morocco) Tan-Tan	3,800	TBD	3,600	CfD rejected	2029	Submarine
Gridlink Interconnector	GridLink Interconnector Ltd	(England) Kingsnorth, Kent	(France) Warande	140	525	1,400	France rejected	2030	Submarine
AQUIND	AQUIND Limited	(England) Lovedean, Hampshire	(France) Barnabos	240	320	2,000	Ofgem rejected	TBC	Submarine

== National links ==
=== Operational ===
Per the below list, the United Kingdom has, as of 2025, a national interconnector capacity of 4,550 MW.

Name	Developers	Substation 1	Substation 2	Length (km)	Voltage (kV)	Power (MW)	Operational	Remarks
Moyle Interconnector	Mutual Energy	(Scotland) Auchencrosh, South Ayrshire	(Northern Ireland) Ballycronan More, County Antrim	63.5	250	500	2001	Submarine; HVDC
Caithness - Moray Link	Scottish and Southern Electricity Networks	(Scotland) Caithness	(Scotland) Moray	160	320	1,200	2019	Submarine; HVDC
Western HVDC Link	National Grid and ScottishPower Transmission	(Scotland) Hunterston, Ayrshire	(Wales) Flintshire Bridge, Flintshire	422	600	2,250	2019	Submarine; HVDC
Shetland HVDC Connection	Scottish and Southern Electricity Networks	(Scotland) Kergord, Shetland	(Scotland) Noss Head, Caithness	260	320	600	2024	Submarine; HVDC

=== Under construction and proposed ===
Name	Developers	Substation 1	Substation 2	Length (km)	Voltage (kV)	Power (MW)	Operational	Remarks
Eastern Green Link 1 (EGL1)	National Grid and SP Energy Networks	(Scotland) Torness, East Lothian	(England) Hawthorn Pit, County Durham	196	525	2,000	2029 (under construction)	Subsea and underground HVDC
Eastern Green Link 2 (EGL2)	National Grid and Scottish and Southern Electricity Networks	(Scotland) Peterhead, Aberdeenshire	(England) Drax, North Yorkshire	505	525	2,000	2029 (under construction)	Subsea and underground HVDC
Western Isles HVDC connection	Scottish and Southern Electricity Networks	(Scotland) Arnish, Isle of Lewis	(Scotland) Beauly, Highland	165	Not specified	1,800	2030 (proposed)	Subsea and underground HVDC
Spittal to Peterhead subsea cable link	Scottish and Southern Electricity Networks	(Scotland) Banniskirk Hub, near Spittal, Caithness	(Scotland) Netherton Hub, near Peterhead, Aberdeenshire	220	525	2,000	2030 (under construction)	Subsea and underground HVDC
Sea Link	National Grid	(England) Friston, Suffolk	(England) Minster, Kent	138	525	2,000	2031 (approved)	Subsea and underground HVDC
LirIC	Transmission Investment	(Scotland) Hunterston, North Ayrshire	(Northern Ireland) Kilroot, County Antrim	142	320	700	2032 (proposed)	Subsea HVDC (plus onshore cable sections)
Eastern Green Link 3 (EGL3)	National Grid and Scottish and Southern Electricity Networks	(Scotland) Peterhead, Aberdeenshire	(England) Walpole, Norfolk	575	525	2,000	2033 (proposed)	Subsea and underground HVDC
Eastern Green Link 4 (EGL4)	National Grid and ScottishPower Energy Networks	(Scotland) Westfield, Fife	(England) Walpole, Norfolk	525	TBC	2,000	2033 (proposed)	Subsea and underground HVDC
Eastern Green Link 5 (EGL5)	National Grid and Scottish and Southern Electricity Networks	TBC (Eastern Scotland)	(England) TBC (Lincolnshire area)	525	TBC	2,000	2035 (proposed)	Subsea and underground HVDC

== See also ==
- Electricity sector in the United Kingdom
- List of power stations in the United Kingdom
- List of high-voltage transmission links in Denmark
- List of high-voltage transmission links in Norway
- List of high-voltage transmission links in Ireland
