= List of high-voltage transmission links in Ireland =

List of high-voltage transmission links in Ireland, including some under construction or proposed.

As of 2025, there are three operational interconnectors from both the Republic of Ireland and Northern Ireland to Great Britain, providing an interconnector capacity of 1,500 MW.

Name	Developers	Substation IE	Substation 2	Length (km)	Voltage (kV)	Power (MW)	Operational	Remarks
Moyle Interconnector	Mutual Energy	(United Kingdom) Ballycronan More	(United Kingdom) Auchencrosh, South Ayrshire	63.5	250	500	2001	submarine HVDC
East–West Interconnector	EirGrid Interconnector Designated Activity Company	(Republic of Ireland) Rush, County Dublin	(United Kingdom) Shotton, Flintshire	261	±200	500	2012	submarine HVDC
Greenlink	Element Power & Partners Group	(Republic of Ireland) Great Island	(United Kingdom) Pembroke	190	320	500	2025	submarine HVDC
Celtic Interconnector	EirGrid and RTE	(Republic of Ireland) Knockraha	(France) La Martyre	575	±320	700	2028 (under construction)	submarine HVDC
LirIC	Transmission Investment	(United Kingdom) Kilroot	(United Kingdom) Hunterston	142	320	700	2032 (planned)	2 submarine HVDC cables
MaresConnect	MaresConnect Limited	(Republic of Ireland) Dublin	(United Kingdom) Bodelwyddan	190		750	2032 (planned)	submarine HVDC

== See also ==
- Electricity sector in Ireland
- List of power stations in the Republic of Ireland
- List of high-voltage transmission links in the United Kingdom
