= List of power stations in the Republic of Ireland =

This page lists all of the power stations operating in the Republic of Ireland.

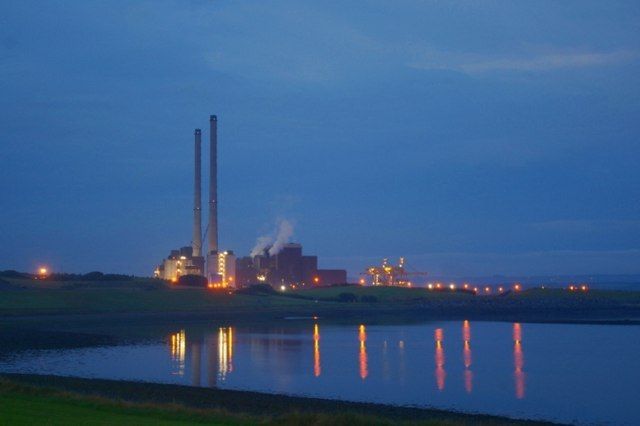
Moneypoint (heavy fuel oil, formerly coal)

== Power plants ==
The table below gives a detailed overview of the fossil-fuel based power plants operating in Ireland in 2017. The data is publicly available and updated annually by the Irish Transmission System Operator (TSO), EirGrid, in its Generation Adequacy Report. In total there was 6609 MW of power plants available in 2017.

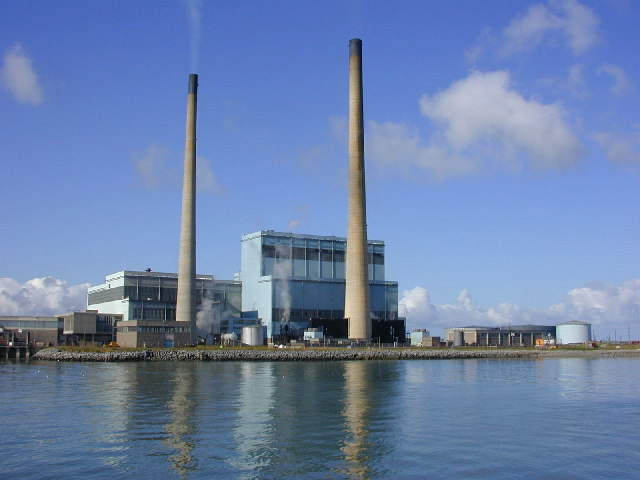
Tarbert (heavy fuel oil)

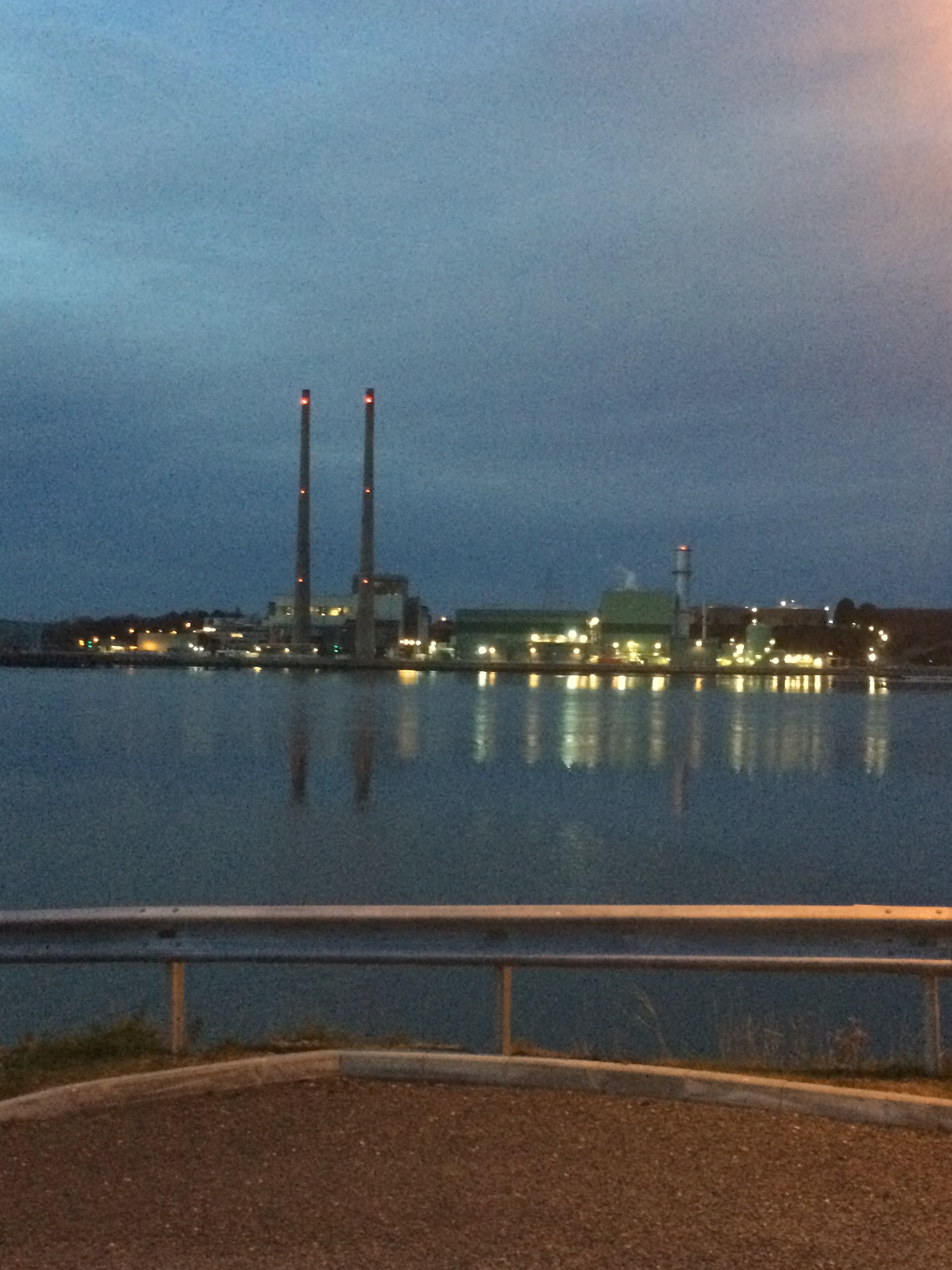
Great Island (natural gas)

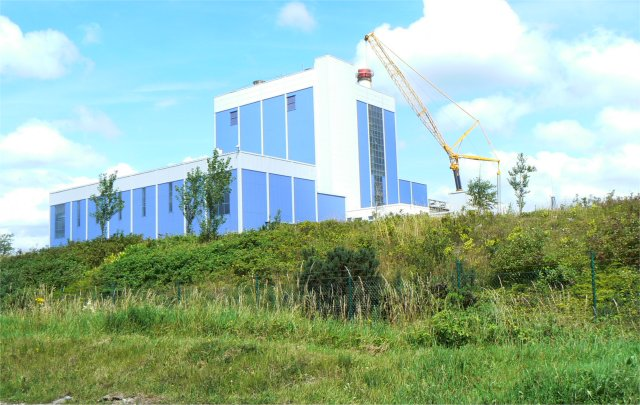
Edenderry (biomass)

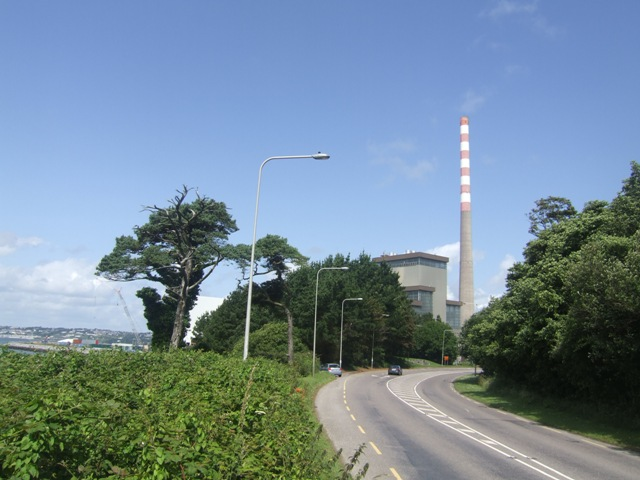
Aghada (distillate oil)

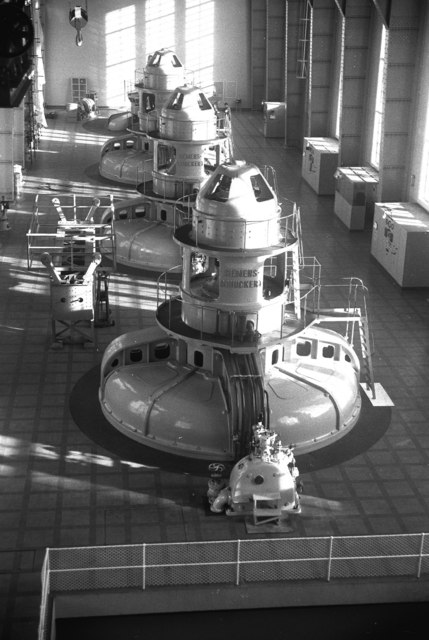
Ardnacrusha (hydro)

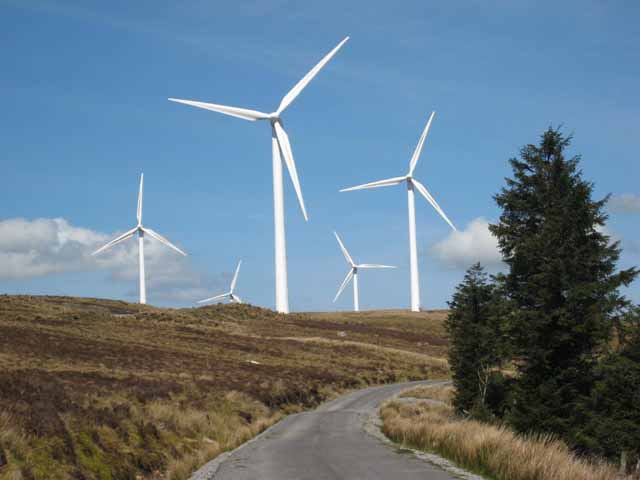
Black Banks (wind)

Station	ID	Capacity (MW)	Primary fuel	Secondary fuel	Cycle	Boiler type	Condenser cooling
Aghada (Note: Initially to be shut by 2023, but closure notice was withdrawn)	AT1	90	Gas	Distillate oil	Open cycle	n/a	n/a
Aghada	AT2	90	Gas	Distillate oil	Open cycle	n/a	n/a
Aghada	AT4	90	Gas	Distillate oil	Open cycle	n/a	n/a
Aghada	AD2	431	Gas	Distillate oil	Combined cycle	Waste heat recovery	Water
All Demand Side Units	DSU	260	DSU	n/a			
Dublin Bay	DB1	402	Gas	Distillate oil	Single shaft combined cycle	Waste heat recovery	Seawater
Dublin Waste		61	Waste				Water
Edenderry (Note: Planning permission extended to end 2023)	ED1	118	Biomass (Note: Peat-fired until 2023)	n/a	Condensing steam turbine	Bubbling fluidising bed	Water
Edenderry OCGT	ED3	58	Distillate oil	n/a	Open cycle	n/a	Water
Edenderry OCGT	ED5	58	Distillate oil	n/a	Open cycle	n/a	Water
Great Island CCGT	GI4	464	Gas	DO	Combined cycle	HRSG	Water
Huntstown	HNC	339	Gas	Distillate oil	Combined cycle	Waste heat recovery	Air
Huntstown	HN2	397	Gas	Distillate oil	Combined cycle	Waste heat recovery	Air
Indaver Waste	IW1	17	Waste				Air
Moneypoint	MP1	285	Heavy fuel oil (Note: Coal-fired until 2025)	n/a	Condensing steam cycle	Drum	Water
Moneypoint	MP2	285	Heavy fuel oil	n/a	Condensing steam cycle	Drum	Water
Moneypoint	MP3	285	Heavy fuel oil	n/a	Condensing steam cycle	Drum	Water
North Wall (Note: To be shut by 2023)	NW5	104	Gas	Distillate oil	Open cycle	n/a	n/a
Poolbeg	PBC	463	Gas	Distillate oil	Combined cycle	Waste heat recovery	Water
Rhode	RP1	52	Distillate oil	n/a	Open cycle	n/a	n/a
Rhode	RP2	52	Distillate oil	n/a	Open cycle	n/a	n/a
Sealrock	SK3	81	Gas	Distillate oil	Open cycle	Waste heat recovery	Water
Sealrock	SK4	81	Gas	Distillate oil	Open cycle	Waste heat recovery	Water
Tarbert	TB1	54	Heavy fuel oil	n/a	Condensing steam cycle	Drum	Water
Tarbert	TB2	54	Heavy fuel oil	n/a	Condensing steam cycle	Drum	Water
Tarbert	TB3	241	Heavy fuel oil	n/a	Condensing steam cycle	Once-through	Water
Tarbert	TB4	243	Heavy fuel oil	n/a	Condensing steam cycle	Once-through	Water
Tawnaghmore	TP1	52	Distillate oil	n/a	Open cycle	n/a	n/a
Tawnaghmore	TP3	52	Distillate oil	n/a	Open cycle	n/a	n/a
Tynagh	TYC	386	Gas	Distillate oil	Combined cycle	n/a	Air
Whitegate power station (Note: PSO levy runs out in 2019)	WG1	444	Gas	Distillate oil	Combined cycle	Waste heat recovery	Air

== Renewable ==
=== Non-dispatchable plants ===
This table outlines the type and capacity of non-dispatchable renewable energy generation in Ireland, which was over 3 GW in 2015. In 2010 it was 1223 MW. The vast majority of it is generated by Irish wind farms.

Type	Capacity (MW)
Wind	4,300 (2020)
Solar	1,000
Biomass	34
Hydro	22

=== Hydroelectric ===
Station	River	Site	Coordinates	Capacity (MW)	Plant (h.p. horse power)	Electricity sent out 1958 (MWh)	Ref
Anarget		County Donegal		0.804			
Ashgrove		County Kerry		0.6			
Ardnacrusha	Shannon	County Clare		85.5	2 × 30,000 h.p. Francis turbines 1 × 34,000 h.p. Francis turbine 1 × 30,000 h.p. Kaplan turbine	306,821	
Ballisodare		County Sligo		1.82			
Belmont		County Offaly		0.43			
Bennetsbridge		County Kilkenny		0.07			
Boyle		County Roscommon		0.13			
Carrigadrohid	Lee	County Cork		8	1 × 11,600 h.p. Kaplan turbine	14,922	
Castlegrace		County Tipperary		0.1			
Cathaleen's Falls	Erne	County Donegal		45	2 × 31,750 h.p. Kaplan turbines	194,095	
Celbridge	Liffey	County Kildare		0.055			
Clady	Gweedore	County Donegal		4	1 × 45,650 h.p. Francis turbine	commissioned 1959	
Cliff	Erne	County Donegal		10	2 × 14,250 h.p. Kaplan turbines	78,438	
Collooney		County Sligo		0.510			
Cottoners	Kilorgan	County Kerry		1			
Edergole	Lough Belshade	County Donegal		0.65	Vertical Pelton (188 metres head)		
Glenlough		County Cork		0.36			
Holy Cross		County Tipperary		0.205			
Inch Mills		County Kilkenny		0.1			
Inniscarra	Lee	County Cork		19	1 × 21,000 h.p. Kaplan turbine 1 × 5,800 h.p. Kaplan turbine	52,509	
Milford		County Carlow		0.29			
Owenbeg		County Cork		0.8			
Poulaphuca	Liffey	County Wicklow		30	2 × 21,000 h.p. Kaplan turbines	23,508	
Golden Falls	Liffey	County Wicklow		4.0	1 × 5,230 h.p. propeller turbine	9,089	
Leixlip	Liffey	County Kildare		4.0	1 × 5,800 h.p. Kaplan turbine	14,611	
Turlough Hill (pumped storage)		County Wicklow		292			

== Former power stations ==
New power stations were commissioned in the 1950s to meet the increasing demand for electricity. These included the following.

Station	County	Capacity (MW)	Type/fuel	Generating plant	Transformers	Electricity supplied in 1957–8 (MWh)	Commissioned
Allenwood	Kildare	40	Peat	2 × 20 MW	2 × 10/110kV, 40,000 kVA	216,014	1952
Arigna	Roscommon	15	Coal	1 × 15 MW	1 × 10/110kV, 1,500 kVA		1958
Bellacorick	Mayo	40	Peat	2 × 20 MW			1960
Cahirciveen	Kerry	5	Peat	1 × 5 MW	1 × 10/110kV, 6,000 kVA	3,056	1957
Clady	Donegal	4	Hydro-electric	1 × 4 MW	1 × 10/38kV, 5,000 kVA		1959
Ferbane	Offaly	60	Peat	3 × 20 MW	3 × 10/110kV, 75,000 kVA	123,043	1957
Gweedore	Donegal	5	Peat	1 × 5 MW	1 × 10/38kV, 5,000 kVA	343	1957
Lanesborough	Longford	20	Peat	1 × 20 MW	1 × 10/110kV, 22,500 kVA		1958
Marina CC	Cork	90-120	Originally coal and oil, then gas				1954
Miltown-Malbay	Clare	5	Peat	1 × 5 MW	1 × 10/38kV, 5,000 kVA	11,651	1957
Pigeon House	Dublin	95	Coal	4 × 20 MW + 15 MW	5 × 5/38kV, 110,000 kVA	689	Originally 1932–40, 1948
Portarlington	Laois	25	Peat	2 × 12.5 MW. Cooling tower	1 × 10/110kV, 40,000 kVA	129,952	1950
Ringsend	Dublin	90	Coal & oil	3 × 30 MW	2 × 10/38kV, 70,000 kVA; 1 × 10/110kV, 35,000 kVA; 3 × 38/110kV, 90,000 kVA	273,707	1956
Screeb	Galway	5	Peat	1 × 5 MW	1 × 10/38kV, 5,000 kVA	5,083	1957

Other decommissioned power plants include:

Station	ID	Capacity (MW)	Primary fuel	Commissioned	Decommissioned
Aghada	AD1	258	Gas	1980	2019
West Offaly	WO4	137	Peat	2005	2020

== See also ==
- East-West Interconnector
- Moyle Interconnector
- Greenlink
- Celtic Interconnector (under construction)
- List of power stations in Europe
- List of largest power stations in the world
- Pumped-storage hydroelectricity
- List of high-voltage transmission links in the Republic of Ireland
