= Electricity in Great Britain =

Overview of the electricity sector in Great Britain

Electricity sector of Great Britain
Data
- Electricity coverage: 100% (91.8% grid 2017)
- Continuity of supply: 99.9999%
- Installed capacity: 74.8 GW (2023)
- Production: 292.7 TWh (2023)
- Share of fossil energy: 36.65% (2023)
- Share of renewable energy: 46.39% (2023)
- GHG emissions from electricity generation (2020): 181t CO_{2} per GWh
- Average electricity use (2023): 3,239 kWh/person
- Transmission & Distribution losses (2017): 7.5%

Institutions
- Responsibility for regulation: Office of Gas and Electricity Markets
- Responsibility for policy-setting: Parliament of the United Kingdom
- Electricity sector law: Electricity Act 1989

Electricity supplied (net) 1920 to 2024, showing reduction following the 2008 financial crisis and with improving efficiency of electrical devices, such as LED lamps

The National Grid covers most of mainland Great Britain and several of the surrounding islands, and there are interconnectors to Northern Ireland and to other European countries. Power is supplied to consumers at 230 volts AC with a frequency of 50 Hz. As of 2024, wind generates 30% of the yearly electrical energy on the grid, whereas fossil gas generated just over 25% and over two-thirds was low-carbon power. Coal power ceased in 2024. Nuclear is currently the second biggest low carbon source, some of which is imported from France. The government is aiming for greenhouse gas emissions from electricity in Britain to be net zero by 2035.

The use of electricity declined in the 2010s and early 2020s, attributed largely to a decline in industrial activity and a switch to more energy efficient lighting and appliances. However demand is projected to increase considerably due to electrification, such as heat pumps and electric vehicles.

UK energy policy includes capping some residential energy price rates, and wholesale prices for some new low-carbon power can be stabilized by the government.

Nationalisation plans are currently underway following the proposed introduction of Great British Energy subsequent to the 2024 King's Speech, which also oversaw increased dedication towards net-zero targets by 2050. This is further emphasised via GB Energy through heavy investment in renewable energy sources, such as tidal power and offshore windfarms.

== History ==
=== Business structure until privatisation ===
During the late 19th and early 20th centuries, hundreds of local small electricity supply firms emerged, a mix of private companies and local authority undertakings. In the early 1900s Britain had the highest per capita energy consumption in the world except for the United States, but by 1920 per capita electricity consumption had fallen behind the U.S., Norway, Germany and Sweden, and was similar to that of France, Italy and Spain. This fall was attributed to the disparate structure of the industry; for example, in 1914 suppliers in the London area used ten different operating frequencies and many different voltages.

In 1919, Electricity Commissioners were established to encourage amalgamation and interconnection, but they had no statutory power to force this. In 1925 nearly 600 electricity undertakings still existed in Britain. In March 1926 the Central Electricity Board (CEB) was established by the government of Stanley Baldwin, with broad political support to rectify this problem including providing transmission lines to interconnect the best power stations to undertakings and to sell power between them at a "bulk tariff", improving overall system efficiency. A substantial national grid was built by 1933. The system load factor rose from about 28% to 38.4% by 1939, and average generation thermal efficiency doubled from 10.4% in 1922 to 21% in 1940.

The electricity supply industry was nationalised in 1948 by the Electricity Act 1947, into the British Electricity Authority (1948–1955) and later the Central Electricity Authority (1955–1957). The Central Electricity Generating Board (CEGB) became responsible for electricity generation, transmission and bulk sales in England and Wales from 1958 until privatisation of the electricity industry in the 1990s. The Electricity Council was also established in 1958, as the coordinating and policy-making body for the British electricity supply industry.

=== National grid ===
The first to use Nikola Tesla's three-phase high-voltage electric power distribution in the United Kingdom was Charles Merz, of the Merz & McLellan consulting partnership, at his Neptune Bank Power Station near Newcastle upon Tyne. This opened in 1901, and by 1912 had developed into the largest integrated power system in Europe. The rest of the country, however, continued to use a patchwork of small supply networks.

In 1925, the British government asked Lord Weir, a Glaswegian industrialist, to solve the problem of Britain's inefficient and fragmented electricity supply industry. Weir consulted Merz, and the result was the Electricity (Supply) Act 1926, which recommended that a "national gridiron" supply system be created. The 1926 act created the Central Electricity Board, which set up the UK's first synchronised, nationwide AC grid, running at 132 kV, 50 Hz.

The grid was created with 4,000 miles of cables – mostly overhead – linking the 122 most efficient power stations. The first "grid tower" was erected near Edinburgh on 14 July 1928, and work was completed in September 1933, ahead of schedule and on budget. The system began operating in 1933 as a series of regional grids with auxiliary interconnections for emergency use. Following the unauthorised but successful short term parallelling of all regional grids by the night-time engineers on 29 October 1937, by 1938 the grid was operating as a national system. By then, the growth in the number of electricity users was the fastest in the world, rising from three quarters of a million in 1920 to nine million in 1938. It proved its worth during the Blitz when South Wales provided power to replace lost output from Battersea and Fulham power stations. The grid was nationalised by the Electricity Act 1947, which also created the British Electricity Authority. In 1949, the British Electricity Authority decided to upgrade the grid by adding 275 kV links.

At its inception in 1950, the 275 kV transmission system was designed to form part of a national supply system, with an anticipated total demand of 30,000 MW by 1970. This predicted demand was already exceeded by 1960. The rapid load growth led the Central Electricity Generating Board (CEGB) to carry out a study of future transmission needs, completed in September 1960. The study is described in a paper presented to the Institution of Electrical Engineers by Booth, Clark, Egginton and Forrest in 1962.

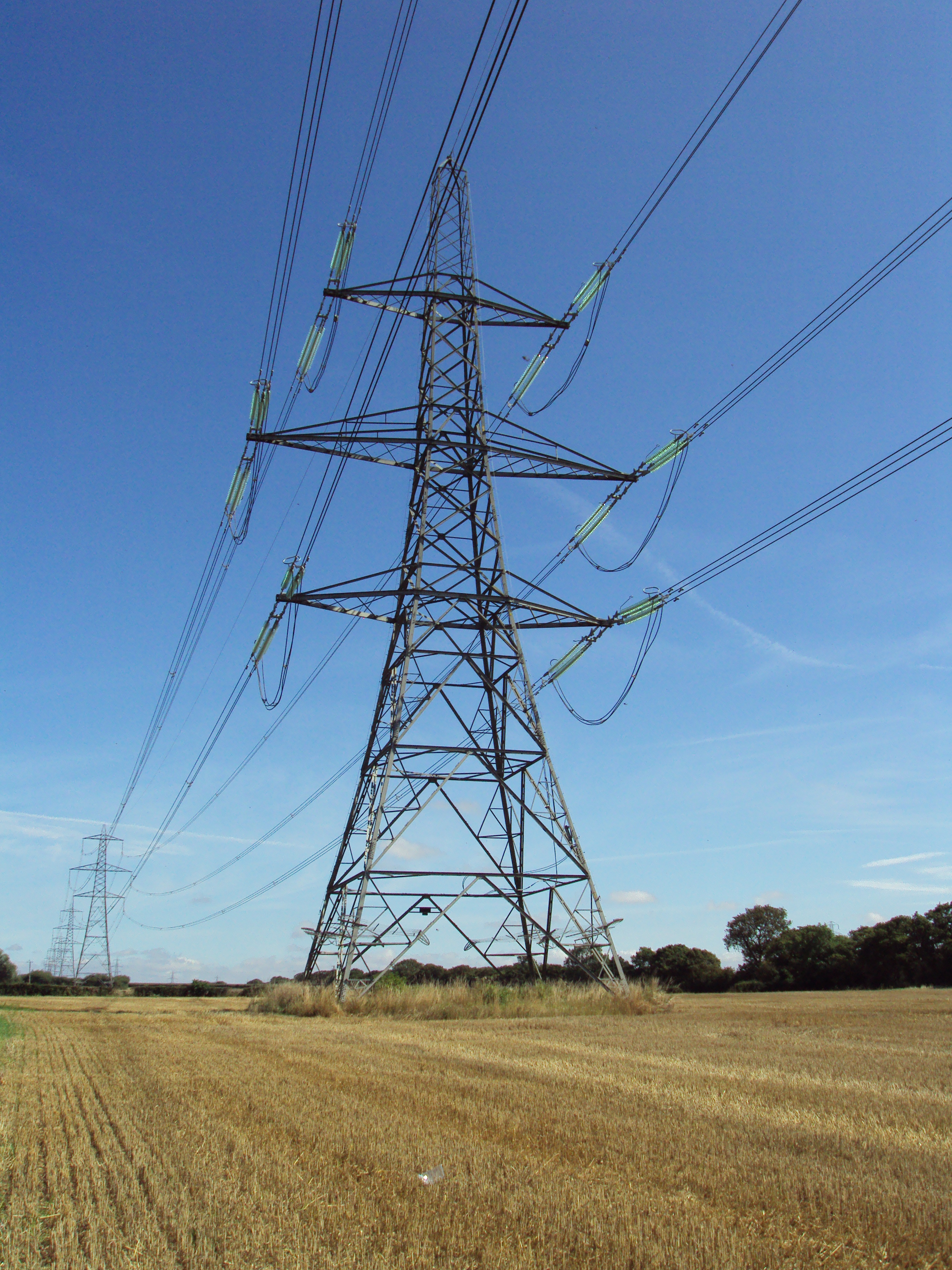
400 kV power line in Cheshire

Considered in the study, together with the increased demand, was the effect on the transmission system of the rapid advances in generator design, resulting in projected power stations of 2,000–3,000 MW installed capacity. These new stations were mostly to be sited where advantage could be taken of cheap low-grade fuel and adequate supplies of cooling water, but these locations did not coincide with the load centres. West Burton, with 4 × 500 MW machines, sited on the Nottinghamshire coalfield near the River Trent, is a typical example. These developments shifted the emphasis on the transmission system from interconnection to bulk power transfers from the generation areas to the load centres, such as the anticipated transfer in 1970 of some 6,000 MW from the Midlands to the Home counties.

Continued reinforcement and extension of the existing 275 kV systems were examined as possible solutions. However, in addition to the technical problem of very high fault levels, many more lines would have been required to obtain the estimated transfers at 275 kV. As this was not consistent with the CEGB's policy of preservation of amenities, a further solution was sought. Consideration was given to both a 400 kV and a 500 kV scheme as the alternatives, either of which gave a sufficient margin for future expansion. A 400 kV system was chosen, for two main reasons. First, the majority of the 275 kV lines could be uprated to 400 kV, and secondly it was envisaged that operation at 400 kV could commence in 1965, compared with 1968 for a 500 kV scheme. Design work was started, and to meet the 1965 timescale, the contract engineering for the first projects had to run concurrently with the design. This included the West Burton 400 kV indoor substation, the first section of which was commissioned in June 1965. From 1965, the grid was partly upgraded to 400 kV, beginning with a 150-mile (241 km) line from Sundon to West Burton, to become the Supergrid.

With the development of the national grid and the switch to using electricity, United Kingdom electricity consumption increased by around 150% between the post war nationalisation of the industry in 1948 and the mid-1960s. During the 1960s growth slowed as the market became saturated.

On the breakup of the CEGB in 1990, the ownership and operation of the National Grid in England and Wales passed to National Grid Company plc, later to become National Grid Transco, and now National Grid plc. In Scotland the grid was already split into two separate entities, one for southern and central Scotland and the other for northern Scotland, connected by interconnectors. The first is owned and maintained by SP Energy Networks, a subsidiary of Scottish Power, and the other by SSE. However, National Grid plc remained the system operator for the whole British grid until the creation of the National Energy System Operator on 1 October 2024.

=== Generation ===
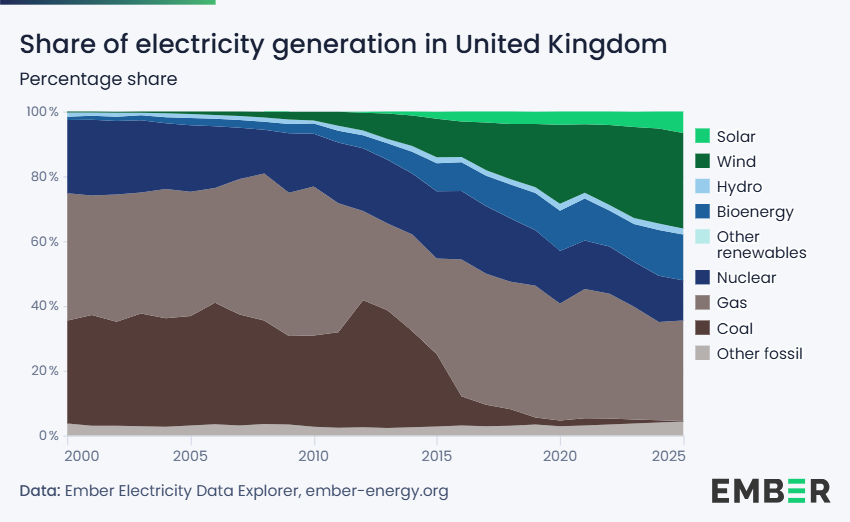
United Kingdom electricity generation by source: percentage share, 2000–2025

The mode of generation has changed over the years. During the 1940s some 90% of the generating capacity was fired by coal, with oil providing most of the remainder.

The United Kingdom started to develop a nuclear generating capacity in the 1950s, with Calder Hall being connected to the grid on 27 August 1956. Though the production of weapons-grade plutonium was the main reason behind this power station, other civil stations followed, and 26% of the nation's electricity was generated from nuclear power at its peak in 1997.

During the 1960s and 70s, coal plants were built to supply consumption despite economic challenges. During the 1970s and 80s some nuclear sites were built. After the 2000s, renewables – wind, solar and to a lesser extent hydroelectricity – added significant capacity. In Q3 2016, nuclear and renewables each supplied a quarter of British electricity, with coal supplying 3.6%. Despite the flow of North Sea oil from the mid-1970s, oil-fuelled generation remained relatively small and continued to decline.

Starting in 1993, and continuing through the 1990s, a combination of factors led to a so-called dash for gas, during which the use of coal was scaled back in favour of gas-fuelled generation. This was sparked by political concerns, the privatisation of the National Coal Board, British Gas and the Central Electricity Generating Board; the introduction of laws facilitating competition within the energy markets; the availability of cheap gas from the North Sea and elsewhere, and the high efficiency and reduced pollution from combined-cycle gas turbine (CCGT) generation. In 1990 just 1.09% of all gas consumed in the country was used in electricity generation; by 2004 the figure was 30.25%.

By 2004, coal use in power stations had fallen to 50.5 million tonnes, representing 82.4% of all coal used in 2004 (a fall of 43.6% compared to 1980 levels), though up slightly from its low in 1999. On several occasions in May 2016, Britain burned no coal for electricity for the first time since 1882. On 21 April 2017, Britain went a full day without using coal power for the first time since the Industrial Revolution, according to National Grid. The last remaining coal power station in the United Kingdom ceased operating on 30 September 2024.

=== UK 'energy gap' ===
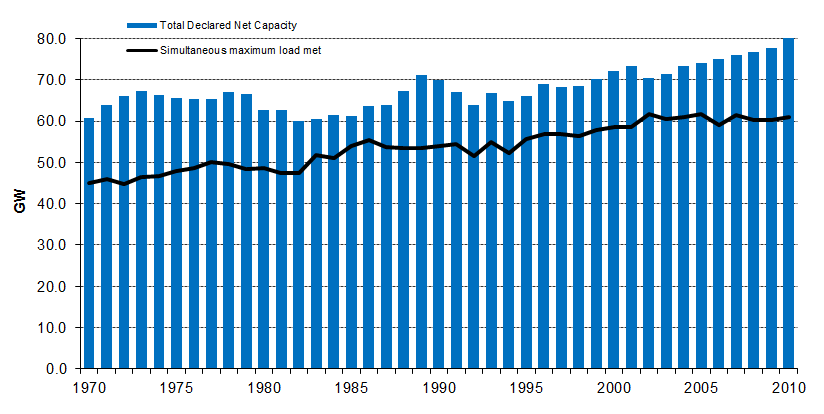
UK Electricity Capacity Margin

In the early years of the 2000s, concerns grew over the prospect of an 'energy gap' in United Kingdom generating capacity. This was forecast to arise because it was expected that a number of coal fired power stations would close due to being unable to meet the clean air requirements of the European Large Combustion Plant Directive (directive 2001/80/EC). In addition, the United Kingdom's remaining Magnox nuclear stations were to have closed by 2015. The oldest AGR nuclear power station has had its life extended by ten years, and it was likely many of the others could be life-extended, reducing the potential gap suggested by the current accounting closure dates of between 2014 and 2023 for the AGR power stations.

A report from the industry in 2005 forecast that, without action to fill the gap, there would be a 20% shortfall in electricity generation capacity by 2015. Similar concerns were raised by a report published in 2000 by the Royal Commission on Environmental Pollution (Energy – The Changing Climate). The 2006 Energy Review attracted considerable press coverage – in particular in relation to the prospect of constructing a new generation of nuclear power stations, in order to prevent the rise in carbon dioxide emissions that would arise if other conventional power stations were to be built.

Among the public, according to a November 2005 poll conducted by YouGov for Deloitte, 35% of the population expected that by 2020 the majority of electricity generation would come from renewable energy (more than double the government's target, and far larger than the 5.5% generated as of 2008), 23% expected that the majority will come from nuclear power, and only 18% that the majority will come from fossil fuels. 92% thought the Government should do more to explore alternative power generation technologies to reduce carbon emissions.

=== Plugging the energy gap ===
The first move to plug the United Kingdom's projected energy gap was the construction of the conventionally gas-fired Langage Power Station and Marchwood Power Station which became operational in 2010.

In 2007, proposals for the construction of two new coal-fired power stations were announced, in Tilbury, Essex and in Kingsnorth, Kent. If built, they would have been the first coal-fired stations to be built in the United Kingdom in 20 years.

Beyond these new plants, there were a number of options that might be used to provide the new generating capacity, while minimising carbon emissions and producing less residues and contamination. Fossil fuel power plants might provide a solution if there was a satisfactory and economical way of reducing their carbon emissions. Carbon capture might provide a way of doing this; however the technology is relatively untried and costs are relatively high. As of 2006 there were no power plants in operation with a full carbon capture and storage system, and as of 2018 the situation is that there are no viable CCS systems worldwide.

=== Energy gap disappears ===
However, due to reducing demand in the late-2000s recession removing any medium term gap, and high gas prices, in 2011 and 2012 over 2 GW of older, less efficient, gas generation plant was mothballed. In 2011 electricity demand dropped 4%, and about 6.5 GW of additional gas-fired capacity is being added over 2011 and 2012. Early in 2012 the reserve margin stood at the high level of 32%.

Another important factor in reduced electrical demand in recent years has come from the phasing out of incandescent light bulbs and a switch to compact fluorescent and LED lighting. Research by the University of Oxford has shown that the average annual electrical consumption for lighting in a UK home fell from 720 kWh in 1997 to 508 kWh in 2012. Between 2007 and 2015, the UK's peak electrical demand fell from 61.5 GW to 52.7.GW.

In June 2013, the industry regulator Ofgem warned that the UK's energy sector faced "unprecedented challenges" and that "spare electricity power production capacity could fall to 2% by 2015, increasing the risk of blackouts". Proposed solutions "could include negotiating with major power users for them to reduce demand during peak times in return for payment".

The use of electricity declined 9% from 2010 to 2017, attributed largely to a decline in industrial activity and a switch to more energy efficient lighting and appliances. By 2018 per capita electrical generation had fallen to the same level as in 1984.

In January 2019 Nick Butler, in the Financial Times, wrote: "costs of all forms of energy (apart from nuclear) have fallen dramatically and there is no shortage of supply", partly based on the reserve capacity auction for 2021–2022 achieving extremely low prices.

=== Race for net zero ===
In 2007, the United Kingdom Government agreed to an overall European Union target of generating 20% of the EU's energy supply from renewable sources by 2020. Each EU member state was given its own allocated target; for the United Kingdom it was 15%. This was formalised in January 2009 with the passage of the EU Renewables Directive. As renewable heat and fuel production in the United Kingdom were at extremely low bases, RenewableUK estimated that this would require 35–40% of the UK's electricity to be generated from renewable sources by that date, to be met largely by 33–35 GW of installed wind capacity. The 2008 Climate Change Act consists of a commitment to reducing net Greenhouse Gas Emissions by 80% by 2050 (on 1990 levels) and an intermediate target reduction of 26% by 2020.

The Green Deal was UK government policy from 2012 to 2015. It permitted loans for energy saving measures for properties in Great Britain to enable consumers to benefit from energy efficient improvements to their home.

In 2013, renewable sources provided 14.9% of the electricity generated in the United Kingdom, reaching 53.7 TWh of electricity generated. In the second quarter of 2015, renewable electricity generation exceeded 25% and exceeded coal generation for the first time.

In 2013, renewable sources accounted for 5.2% of all energy produced, using the methodology of the 2009 Renewables Directive. By 2015, this had risen to 8.3%.

In June 2017, for the first time renewables plus nuclear generated more UK power than gas and coal together. Britain had the fourth greenest power generation in Europe and the seventh worldwide. In that year, new offshore wind power became cheaper than new nuclear power for the first time.

Government figures for December 2020 showed renewable sources generated 41.4% of the electricity produced in the UK, being around 6% of total UK energy usage. Q4 2022 statistics were similar, with low carbon electricity generation (which includes nuclear) at 57.9 per cent of total electricity generation (same as Q4 2021).

From 2020, a rapid expansion of grid scale battery storage took place, helping to cope with the variability in wind and solar power. As of May 2021, 1.3 GW of grid storage batteries was active, and by June 2024 the capacity was 4.6 GW of power and 5.9 GWh of energy, supplementing the earlier pumped storage at Dinorwig, Cruachan and Ffestiniog.

In 2025, low carbon generation was 63% of total generation, with a peak of 97.7% for a short time on 1 April. Wind power peaked at 23.8 GW on 5 December and solar peaked at 14.0 GW on 8 July.

== Production ==
British grid electricity in 2025
1. Wind (29.7%)
2. Nuclear (11.8%)
3. Biomass (6.90%)
4. Solar (6.50%)
5. Hydro (1.60%)
6. Storage (1.60%)
7. Imports (15.1%)
8. Natural gas (26.8%)

In 2008 nuclear electricity production was 53.2 TW·h, equivalent to 860 kWh per person. In 2014, 28.1 TW·h of energy was generated by wind power, which contributed 9.3% of the UK's electricity requirement. In 2015, 40.4 TW·h of energy was generated by wind power, and the quarterly generation record was set in the three-month period from October to December 2015, with 13% of the nation's electricity demand met by wind. Wind power contributed 15% of UK electricity generation in 2017 and 18.5% in the final quarter of 2017. In 2019, National Grid announced that low-carbon generation technologies had produced more electricity than fossil generators for the first time in Britain.

The electricity sector supplies power to consumers at 230 volts (-6%, +10%) AC with a nominal frequency of 50 Hz.

Electricity production in the United Kingdom (TWh)
	Production	Supplied	Conventional thermal and other	CCGT	Nuclear	Non thermal renewables	Pumped storage
2017	323,157	319,298	60,681	128,153	63,887	67,394	2,862

=== Modes of production ===
In 2020, total electricity production stood at 312 TWh (down from a peak of 385 TWh in 2005), generated from the following sources:

- Gas: 35.7% (0.05% in 1990)
- Nuclear: 16.1% (19% in 1990)
- Wind: 24.2% (0% in 1990), of which:

- Onshore Wind: 11.1%
- Offshore Wind: 13%

- Coal: 1.8% (67% in 1990)
- Bio-Energy: 12.6% (0% in 1990)
- Solar: 4.2% (0% in 1990)
- Hydroelectric: 2.2% (2.6% in 1990)
- Oil and other: 3.3% (12% in 1990)

UK Government energy policy had targeted a total contribution from renewables to achieve 10% by 2010, but it was not until 2012 that this figure was exceeded; renewable energy sources supplied 11.3% (41.3 TWh) of the electricity generated in the United Kingdom in 2012. The Scottish Government had a target of generating 17% to 18% of Scotland's electricity from renewables by 2010, rising to 40% by 2020.

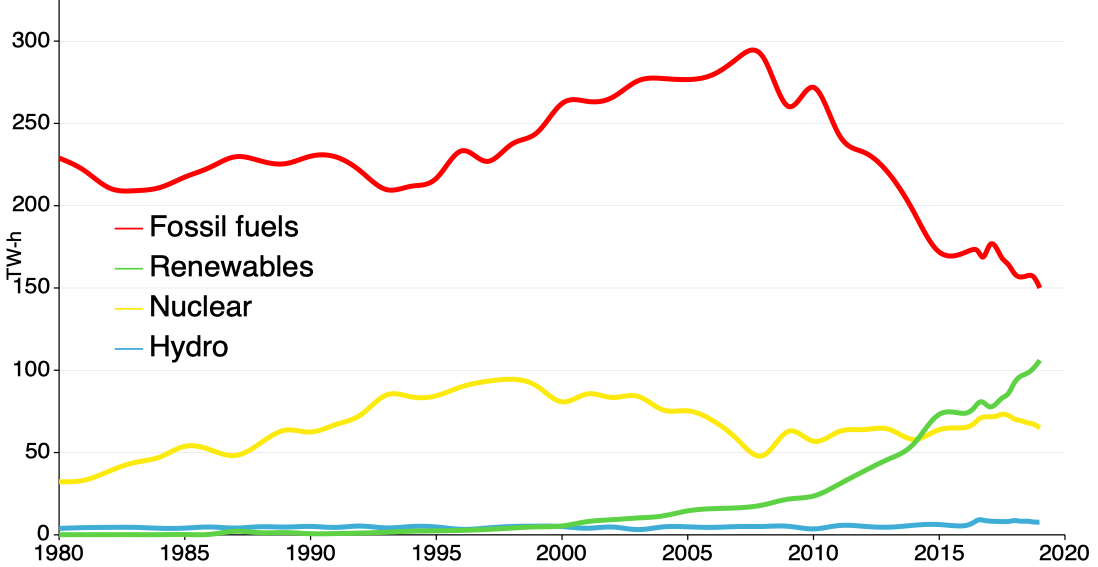
UK electricity production by source 1980–2018

External image
- Current grid status Similar data

The gross production of electricity was 393 TWh in 2004, which gave the UK the 9th position in the world's top producers in that year.

Nationalisation plans are currently underway following the proposed introduction of Great British Energy subsequent to the 2024 King's Speech, which also oversaw increased dedication towards net-zero targets by 2050. This is further emphasised via GB Energy through heavy investment in renewable energy sources, such as tidal power and offshore windfarms. The future body also intends to operate and manage clean power projects at a state level, in contrast with private entities having done so for several years.

Under the most recent estimates, the plan will amount to £8bn. for the government, a figure criticised by the opposition and media alike, although Energy Secretary Ed Miliband has claimed it will have an environmental impact in forwarding sustainability, as well as predicting that it will reduce average electricity thresholds by £1,400 universally. The entity will remain in preliminary stages before implementation of the Great British Energy Bill, whereupon it shall be established after royal assent given in accordance with the law of the United Kingdom.

==== Gas ====
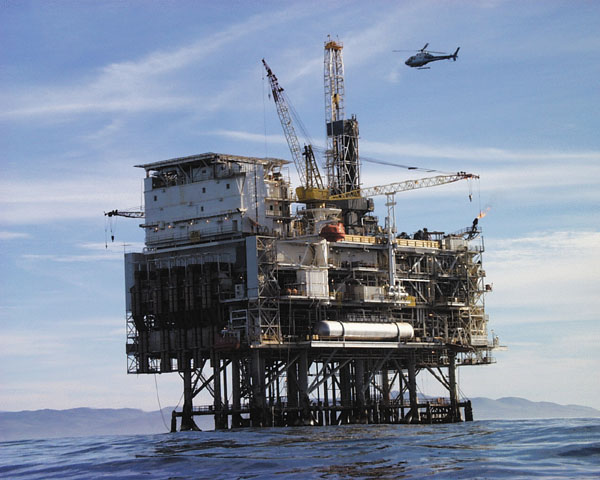
A typical offshore oil/gas platform

Electricity produced with gas was 160 TWh in 2004 and 177 TWh in 2008. In both years the United Kingdom was the fourth highest producer of electricity from gas. In 2005 the UK produced 3.2% of the world total natural gas; ranking fifth after Russia (21.8%), United States (18%), Canada (6.5%) and Algeria (3.2%). In 2009 the UK’s own gas production was less and natural gas was also imported.

Due to reducing demand in the late-2000s recession and high gas prices, in 2011 and 2012 over 2 GW of older, less efficient, gas generation plant was mothballed.

==== Coal ====
In November 2015, the UK Government announced that all fourteen remaining coal-fired power stations would be closed by 2025. In November 2017 the UK Government co-founded the Powering Past Coal Alliance. In June 2021, the government said it would end coal power by October 2024.

The United Kingdom had continuously burned coal for the generation of electricity since the opening of Holborn Viaduct power station in 1882. On several occasions in May 2016, Britain burned no coal for electricity for the first time since then. Three coal plants closed in 2016.

On 21 April 2017, for the first time since 1882, the GB mainland grid had a full 24-hour period without any generation from coal. In May 2019 the GB grid went its first full week without coal power, and in spring/summer 2020 from 10 April, the UK grid ran for 68 days without burning any coal. In 2020, coal produced 4.4 TWh of electricity and Britain went 5,202 hours free from coal electricity generation, up from 3,665 hours in 2019 and 1,856 in 2018.

In August and September 2021, coal plants were restarted amidst a lack of wind, as power imports from Europe were insufficient to satisfy demand.

Coal supplied just over 1% of UK electricity in 2023, down from 30% in 2014. Ratcliffe-on-Soar, the last of the coal-fired power stations, ceased operating on 30 September 2024. In 2025, the UK recorded its first calendar year with no coal power since electricity production began.

==== Nuclear power ====
Nuclear power in the United Kingdom generated around a quarter of the country's electricity as of 2016, projected to rise to a third by 2035. As of 2025, the UK has nine operational nuclear power reactors at five plants over four sites: eight advanced gas-cooled reactors (AGR) and one pressurised water reactor (PWR). There are nuclear reprocessing plants at Sellafield and the Tails Management Facility operated by Urenco in Capenhurst.

==== Renewable energy ====
From the mid-1990s renewable energy began to contribute to the electricity generated in the United Kingdom, adding to a small hydroelectricity generating capacity. Renewable energy sources provided for 11.3% of the electricity generated in the United Kingdom in 2012, reaching 41.3 TWh of electricity generated. As of 2nd quarter 2017, renewables generated 29.8% of the UK's electricity.

Currently, the biggest renewable source of energy in the UK is wind power, and the UK has some of the best wind resources in Europe. The UK has relatively small hydroelectricity deployment and resources, although some pumped storage exists. Solar power is rapidly growing and provides significant power during daylight hours, but total energy provided is still small. Biofuels are also used as a significant source of power. Geothermal is not highly accessible and is not a significant source. Tidal resources are present and experimental projects are being tested, but are likely to be expensive.

Wind power delivers a growing percentage of the energy of the United Kingdom and by the beginning of February 2018, it consisted of 8,655 wind turbines with a total installed nameplate capacity of over 18.4 gigawatts: 12,083 megawatts of onshore capacity and 6,361 megawatts of offshore capacity. This placed the United Kingdom at this time as the world's sixth largest producer of wind power. Polling of public opinion consistently shows strong support for wind power in the UK, with nearly three quarters of the population agreeing with its use, even for people living near onshore wind turbines. Wind power is expected to continue growing in the UK for the foreseeable future, RenewableUK estimates that more than 2 GW of capacity will be deployed per year for the next five years. Within the UK, wind power was the second largest source of renewable energy after biomass in 2013.

In 2014, Imperial College predicted that Britain could have 40% of electricity from solar power in sunny days by 2020 in 10 million homes compared to a half a million homes in start of 2014. If a third of households would generate solar energy it could equal 6% of British total electricity consumption.

==== Diesel ====
Britain has a number of diesel farms for supplying high demand hours of the day, normally in the winter, when other generators such as wind farms or solar farms may happen to have low output. Many of the diesel generators run for fewer than 200 hours a year.

=== Power stations ===
External images
- Map of UK power stations, 2006 Archive
- Archive of British Grid map 2012 Source
- British Grid map 2016 Archive

== Storage ==
The UK has some large pumped storage systems, notably Ffestiniog and Dinorwig Power Station in Wales which can provide 1.7 GW for over 5 hours, having a storage capacity of about 9 GWh, and Cruachan and Loch Mhòr in Scotland, also at several gigawatt-hours.

It also has significant grid battery storage which can supply several gigawatts for a few hours. In June 2024 the capacity was 4.6 GW of power and 5.9 GWh of energy. Historically, these numbers were 2.4 GW / 2.6 GWh at the end of 2022, and 1.3 GW in May 2021. The batteries provide grid support when large grid elements suddenly fail.

In December 2019, the Minety Battery Energy Storage Project started construction, located near Minety, Wiltshire and developed by Penso Power. Chinese investment provided the finance and the China Huaneng Group is responsible for construction and operation. The designed capacity is 100 MWh and uses LiFePo4 battery technology. It started operation in July 2021. In 2020 Penso Power decided to expand the project by 50 MWh, which is expected to start operation later in 2021. It was the biggest storage battery facility in Europe. Several other batteries were built, and many larger ones are under construction.

=== Largest UK grid storage ===
Name	Commissioning date	Energy capacity (MWh)	Power (MW)	Duration (hours)	Type	Area	Refs.
Dinorwig	1984	9100	1700	5	Pumped-storage hydroelectricity	Wales	
Cruachan	1965	7000	440	15	Pumped-storage hydroelectricity	Scotland	
Foyers	1975	6300	300	21	Pumped-storage hydroelectricity	Scotland	
Ffestiniog	1963	1400	360	4	Pumped-storage hydroelectricity	Wales	
Thurrock	2025	600	300	2	Battery	England	
Kilmarnock	2026	600	300	2	Battery	Scotland	1.3 GVA synthetic inertia
Blackhillock	2025	400	200	2	Battery	Scotland	0.3 GVA
Bramley	2025	330	100	3	Battery	England	
Drax	2024	200	100	2	Battery	England	

== Consumption ==
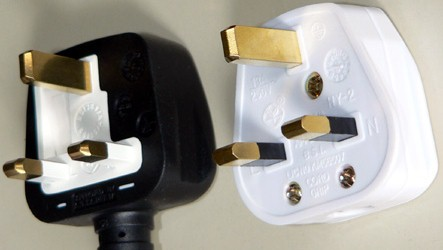
Left: a typical moulded BS 1363 plug, showing the fuse access from the underside of the plug. Right: a typical rewireable plug; the large central screw releases the cover, allowing access to the terminals and also the fuse.

=== Lighting ===
The European Commission banned low efficiency general-purpose, non-directional incandescent lightbulbs from 2012, and similarly shaped higher-efficiency halogen bulbs were banned in 2018. A few specialised bulb types such as for use in ovens are exempt from the ban.

In 2022-2023, the mean domestic electricity usage was 3,239 kWh and the median usage was 2,475 kWh.

== Export and import ==
There are over 10 GW of undersea interconnections between the GB grid and neighbour grids:

- 4 GW with northern France; 2 GW HVDC Cross-Channel from 1986, and a second and third 1 GW connection (IFA2 and ElecLink)
- 1.5 GW with Ireland – 500 MW to Northern Ireland (Moyle from 2001), and 1 GW with the Republic of Ireland (500 MW EWIC from 2012 and 500 MW Greenlink from 2025)
- 1.4 GW with Norway (North Sea Link from 2021)
- 1.4 GW with Denmark (Viking Link from 2024)
- 1 GW with the Netherlands (BritNed from 2011)
- 1 GW Belgium (NEMO Link from 2019)
- 40 MW Isle of Man to England Interconnector (from 2000)

The longest links are the North Sea cables with Norway and Denmark, at 720 kilometres.

The export of electricity was 1–3% of consumption between 2004 and 2009. According to the IEA, by that time the UK was the sixth highest electricity importer, importing 11 TWh, after Brazil (42 TWh), Italy (40 TWh), United States (33 TWh), Netherlands (16 TWh) and Finland (14 TWh).

The 1.4 GW NeuConnect with Germany is under construction. There are also future plans to lay cables to link the GB grid with Iceland (Icelink). A 1.4 GW Scotland–Norway interconnector project was abandoned in 2023 after it lost the support of the Norwegian government.

== Pricing ==
The electricity market is deregulated in the UK, and the cost per MWh for much of the generated electricity is paid at the locational marginal price, which is occasionally negative during low consumption and high winds, starting in 2019. Domestic customers on pass-through wholesale tariffs such as Octopus Agile can access these negative prices. Negative pricing incidents have been increasing: 2022 had 29 hours with negative price, 2023 had 107, and 2024 had at least 149. The price is traded on a spot market (APX Power UK owned by the APX Group).

=== Electricity billing ===
In the UK, an electricity supplier is a retailer of electricity. For each supply point the supplier has to pay the various costs of transmission, distribution, meter operation, data collection, tax etc. The supplier then adds in energy costs and the supplier's own charge.

== Pollution ==
The UK historically had a coal-driven grid that generated large amounts of CO_{2} and other pollutants including SO_{2} and nitrogen oxides, leading to some acid rain found in Norway and Sweden. Coal plants had to be fitted with scrubbers which added to costs.

In 2024 the UK recorded its cleanest electricity to date, with average carbon intensity falling to 124 g CO₂/kWh – 70% lower than the 2014 figure of 419 g CO₂/kWh – following the closure of coal-fired generation and the rapid growth of renewables. Renewables, led by wind, solar and biomass, supplied 45 % of generation, while fossil fuels provided 29 % and nuclear 13 %, cutting annual power-sector emissions from 150 MtCO₂ in 2014 to below 40 MtCO₂ in 2024.

== See also ==
- Energy in the United Kingdom
- Energy policy of the United Kingdom
- National Grid (Great Britain)
- Big Six energy suppliers
- Lists of power stations in the United Kingdom
- High-voltage substations in the United Kingdom
- List of high-voltage transmission links in the United Kingdom
- Electric or Electricity Act
