= All-Ireland Under-20 B Football Championship =

Second tier Gaelic football competition for players under the age of 20

GAA Football All-Ireland Under-20 B Championship
- Current season or competition: 2025 All-Ireland Under-20 B Football Championship
- Irish: Craobh Peile Fé-20 B na hÉireann
- Code: Gaelic football
- Founded: 2024
- Region: Ireland (GAA)
- Trophy: Liam Connor Cup
- No. of teams: 4
- Title holders: Sligo (1st title)
- Most titles: Down / Sligo / Westmeath (1 titles)
- Sponsors: EirGrid
- Official website: http://www.gaa.ie/

The GAA Football All-Ireland Under-20 B Championship is an annual inter-county Gaelic football competition organised by the Gaelic Athletic Association (GAA). It is the second tier inter-county Gaelic football competition for male players between the ages of 17 and 20 in Ireland.

Teams that are eliminated from the early provincial stages of the GAA Football All-Ireland Under-20 Championship qualify for this championship. Four teams currently participate.

The final serves as the culmination of a series of games played during the spring months, and the results determine which team receives the cup. The All-Ireland Championship is played on a straight knockout basis whereby once a team loses they are eliminated from the championship.

== History ==
The All-Ireland Under-20 Football Championship was created in 1964 in response to a Congress motion put forward by the Kerry County Board. Various formats were used in the provincial competitions, however, the All-Ireland series was confined to the four provincial champions. A restructuring of the various provincial championships in 2024 resulted in the creation of Tier 2 competitions for teams who failed to make the latter stages of their provincial series. The four respective provincial Tier 2 champions qualify for the Tier 2 All-Ireland series of games.

== Format ==
=== Qualification ===
Province	Championship	Team progressing
Connacht	Connacht Under-20 B Football Championship	Champions
Leinster	Leinster Under-20 B Football Championship	Champions
Munster	Munster Under-20 B Football Championship	Champions
Ulster	Ulster Under-20 B Football Championship	Champions

=== Championship ===
There are four teams in the All-Ireland Championship. During the course of a championship season three games are played comprising two semi-finals and a final. The championship is played as a single-elimination tournament. Each game is played as a single leg.

== List of finals ==
Year	Winners		Runners-up		Venue	Captain
Year	County	Score	County	Score	Venue	Captain
2024	Down	1-10	Westmeath	0-10	Páirc Tailteann	Finn Murdock
2025	Westmeath	1-15 pens: 4	Monaghan	1-15 AET pens: 1'	Kingspan Breffni Park	Tadhg Baker
2026	Sligo	1-16	Down	0-8	O'Connor Park	Connor Walsh

== Roll of honour ==
=== Performances by county ===
County	Title(s)	Runners-up	Winning years	Losing years
Westmeath	1	1	2025	2024
Down	1	1	2024	2026
Sligo	1	—	2026	—
Monaghan	—	1	—	2025

=== Performances by province ===
Province	Winners	Runners-up	Total
Ulster	1	2	3
Leinster	1	1	2
Connacht	1	—	1

== See also ==
- All-Ireland Under-20 Football Championship
