= Imera (disambiguation) =

Imera is short for I Imera, a Greek newspaper.

Imera may also refer to:

- Imera, Kozani
- Imera, Xanthi
- Imera (company), an Irish company

== See also ==
- Imera Meridionale or Salso, a river in Sicily
