= 2024 All-Ireland Under-20 B Football Championship =

Annual Gaelic football competition

- Dates: 10 April - 18 May 2024
- Teams: 12
- Sponsor: EirGrid
- Champions: Down (1st title); Finn Murdock (captain)
- Runners-up: Westmeath; Brian Cooney (captain)

Tournament statistics
- Matches played: 11
- Goals scored: 28 (2.55 per match)
- Points scored: 216 (19.64 per match)
- Top scorer(s): Brian Cooney (4-18)

The 2024 All-Ireland Under-20 B Football Championship was the inaugural staging of the All-Ireland Under-20 B Football Championship since its establishment by the Gaelic Athletic Association. The championship ran from 10 April to 18 May 2024.

The All-Ireland final was played at Páirc Tailteann in Navan on 18 May 2024 between Down and Westmeath, in what was their first ever meeting in the final. Down won the match by 1–10 to 0–10 to claim their first ever championship title.

Westmeath's Brian Cooney was the championship's top scorer with 4–18.

== Connacht Under-20 B Football Championship ==
=== Connacht final ===
27 April 2024 Final	Leitrim	0-09 - 3-11	Mayo	Philly McGuinness Memorial Park
	B McNulty 0-3, 2f; B Guckian (2f) & P Honeyman (2f) 0-2 each; J Casey & T Plunkett 0-1 each	Report	D Beirne 2-4, 3f; N Hurley 1-1; O Cronin 0-3; D Dolan 0-2, 50 & f; F McLaughlin 0-1

== Leinster Under-20 B Football Championship ==
=== Leinster quarter-final ===
16 April 2024 Quarter-final	Carlow	3-10 - 0-10	Offaly	SETU Carlow Grounds
	L Gavin 2-4 (3fs), Kyle Nolan 0-3, C Brady 1-0, S Cormican, Kieran Nolan, B Kelly 0-1 each	Report	M Dalton 0-3 (2fs), R Gallagher 0-2 (1f), C Melia (f), C Foran (f), R Kellaghan, S Doran, G O’Meara 0-1 each.

=== Leinster semi-finals ===
23 April 2024 Semi-final	Longford	0-13 - 1-07	Wexford	Bertie Allen Park
	M Carey (0-9, 5 frees, 1 ‘45), J Brady Hynes (0-2), P Moran (0-1), M Flynn (0-1).	Report	C Kehoe (1-1); D Cooke Leonard (0-3, one free), D Kehoe (0-1), R Gilbert (0-1), C Kelly (0-1).

23 April 2024 Semi-final	Westmeath	3-09 - 1-10	Carlow	Kinnegad Grounds
	B Cooney 1-4 (0-1f), S Hanley 1-2, R Murray 1-1, J Duncan, S Ormsby 0-1 each.	Report	L Gavin 0-5 (5f), A Kelly 1-0, B Kelly 0-2 (1m), Kieran Nolan, C Brady, J Brady 0-1 each.

=== Leinster final ===
30 April 2024 Final	Westmeath	3-09 - 2-11	Longford	TEG Cusack Park
	B Cooney 3-3 (0-1f), R Cole 0-2, D Lowry, J Duncan, R Murray, S Hanley 0-1 each.	Report	Michael Flynn 1-2, P Moran, M Carey (3f) 0-3 each, J Kelly 1-0, E Williams 0-2, J Brady Hynes 0-1 (f).

== Munster Under-20 B Football Championship ==
=== Munster final ===
10 April 2024 Final	Limerick	2-10 - 1-05	Waterford	Mallow GAA Complex
	A Neville (2-0), R Quirke (0-4, 0-2 frees), D Murray (0-3), J McCarthy (’45), C Ó Dúinn and D Hynes (free) (0-1 each).	Report	S Pender (1-2, 0-1 free), M O’Brien, R Fennell and D Murphy (0-1 each).	Referee: C Dineen

== Ulster Under-20 B Football Championship ==
=== Ulster semi-final ===
22 April 2024 Semi-final	Antrim	0-10 - 1-16	Fermanagh	Dunsilly Centre of Excellence
	N Duffy (0-03), J Hannon (0-02), C Johnston (0-01), T Shivers (0-01), C Walsh (0-01), J Toner (0-01), C McCann (0-01).	Report	M McDermott (1-04), C Brennan (0-03), K Fitzpatrick (0-02), C O’Brien (0-02), S Conlon (0-01), D Owens (0-01), L MacEnri (0-01), L Feely (0-01), C McAnespie (0-01).

=== Ulster final ===
29 April 2024 Final	Fermanagh	1-05 - 1-06	Down	Brewster Park
	J Flanagan 1-0, K Fitzpatrick 0-2 (1f), M McDermott 0-1, S Conlon 0-1 (m), M Burns 0-1.	Report	N Rogers 1-0, C Cunningham 0-1, T McCarroll 0-1, R Quinn 0-1, J Doran 0-1 (f), E Rogers 0-1 (f), C O’Reilly 0-1

== All-Ireland Under-20 B Football Championship ==
=== All-Ireland semi-finals ===
11 May 2024 Semi-final	Westmeath	1-15 - 2-05	Limerick	FBD Semple Stadium
	B Cooney 0-6 (5f), J Duncan 1-0, D Lowry, S Ormsby, R Murray (1f) 0-2 each, T Baker, S Hanley, D Hall 0-1 each.	Report	E Rigter (0-2f), D Murray (1-0 pen, 0-1f, 0-1‘45’) 1-2 each, C Ó Duinn 0-1.

12 May 2024 Semi-final	Mayo	0-15 - 2-10	Down	Kingspan Breffni Park
	T O’Flaherty 0-5 (4 frees), J Mulchrone 0-2, C Keaveney 0-2, O Cronin 0-2, C Dawson 0-1, D Duffy 0-1, S Morahan 0-1, D Dolan 0-1 (free).	Report	D Scullion 2-1, J Doran 0-3, E Rogers 0-1, F Murdock 0-1, S Carr 0-1, R Quinn 0-1, C O'Reilly 0-1, M Murdock 0-1.

=== All-Ireland final ===
18 May 2024 Final	Westmeath	0-10 - 1-10	Down	Páirc Tailteann
	B Cooney 0-5 (4f), D Lowry, L Daly, J Duncan, R Murray, S Corcoran 0-1 each.	Report	D Rafferty 1-0, J Doran (1f, 1‘45’), S Carr 0-3 each, D Scullion 0-2, C Cunningham, D Ruddy 0-1 each.	Referee: M Farrelly (Cavan)

== Championship statistics ==
=== Top scorers ===
Rank	Player	County	Tally	Total	Matches	Average
1	Brian Cooney	Westmeath	4-18	30	4	7.50
2	Liam Gavin	Carlow	2-09	15	2	7.50
3	Matthew Carey	Longford	0-12	12	2	6.00
4	Darragh Beirne	Mayo	2-05	10	2	5.00
5	Mattie McDermott	Fermanagh	1-05	8	2	4.00
