= Sea link (disambiguation) =

A sea link is a vehicle traffic way across the sea.

Sea Link, Sealink, SeaLink or other variations may refer to:

== Companies ==
- Sealink, former British ferry company
- SeaLink New Zealand, ferry company
- Kelsian Group, known as SeaLink Travel Group prior to 2021, Australian public company
  - Kangaroo Island SeaLink, South Australia ferry company and tour operator

== Other ==
- Sea Link, proposed power cable between Suffolk and Kent, United Kingdom
- SEAlink, computer file transfer protocol
- MV Armenistis, formerly MV Sealink
