= Gridlink Interconnector =

Proposed subsea electricity connector between the UK and France

Gridlink

Location
- Country: United Kingdom, France
- Coordinates: 51.4204°N 0.6131°E; 50.9617°N 2.1931°E
- General direction: west-east, northwest–southeast
- From: Kingsnorth, Kent, England
- To: Warande, Nord, France

Construction information
- Expected: 2027

Technical information
- Type: submarine cable
- Current type: high-voltage direct current
- Total length: 140 km (87 mi)
- Capacity: 1,400 MW
- AC voltage: 440 kV
- DC voltage: 525 kV

Gridlink Interconnector is a proposed submarine power cable between England and France. The 1,400 MW high-voltage direct current connector would link Kingsnorth National Grid substation in north Kent, England, with Réseau de Transport d'Électricité Warande substation in Bourbourg (Nord) near Dunkirk in northern France.

== Background ==
Electricity interconnectors are high-voltage transmission links, linking two electricity grids. Electricity can flow in both directions, allowing a grid to import electricity when it is running short so it does not have to fire up old, inefficient fossil fuel power stations. Renewable sources are dependent on the time of day and on the weather conditions; the required load can be balanced by interconnecting grids over a large region, in this case over the Northern Seas Offshore Grid, and the North–South Western EU Interconnections.

== Current status ==
On 28 January 2022 the French Energy Regulatory Commission rejected an investment request by Gridlink to operate the interconnector in France citing legal uncertainties and possibly reduced benefits due to Brexit, stating that "The cost-benefit analysis of the project does not show with sufficient certainty, on average based on the available contrasted scenarios, that the project brings a net benefit to the community."

== Technical description ==
The project to build this 1,400-megawatt (1.4 GW) interconnector comprises

- 140 km (87 miles) submarine cable (108 km (67 miles) in UK waters and 32 km (20 miles) in French territorial waters), working at a direct current voltage of approximately 525 kV.
- Underground cables from the shoreline to the converter station at Kingsnorth and Warande.
- Converter stations in Kingsnorth and Warande where the high-voltage direct current voltage is converted to 400 kV alternating current, which is the working voltage of both the networks.
- Underground high-voltage connector cables from the converter stations to the UK and French networks
- An additional substation in France.

== Proposed project timescale ==
The projected timescale was:

Awarded Project of Common Interest status by the European Commission on 23 November 2017 (Commission Delegated Regulation 2018/540)
Application for UK development consents was for September 2020, and in France November 2020.
Construction contracts were to be awarded July 2021, with detailed planning consents to be completed in September 2021.
Construction was to start December 2021.
Commissioning was due for June 2024.
Commercial operations were to start in December 2024.

On 28 January 2022, the French Energy Regulatory Commission [fr] declined an investment request by Gridlink to operate the interconnector in France, halting the timescale.

== Route ==

The undersea cable connects two national grids, so must run from locations, close to the coast, capable of injecting the extra 1.4 GW of power into the grid. Three points in Northern France were considered Penly, Les Attaques and Warande. Only Warande had sufficient capacity. On the UK side sites along the south coast were rejected as there was not sufficient infrastructure available to transport the electricity to the main network, while the North Kent coast and the banks of Thames Estuary was well supported. The following seven suitable sites were considered before Kingsnorth was selected: Cleve Hill, Coryton, Grain, Kemsley, Kingsnorth, Northfleet East and Rayleigh Main. The existing Kingsnorth sub-station already had the capacity, as the Kingsnorth coal fired power station had been decommissioned, and was 1.5 km (1 mile) from the shore.

The 400 kV alternating current link from the substation at Kingsnorth passes through a 1.5 km (1 mile) underground duct to the converter station which is on the shoreline. The two high-voltage direct current undersea cables enter a trench under the sea perpendicular to the shore and under the shipping channel where it follows the southern bank until off Grain where it crosses the channel and leaves the Medway passing to the north of the Sheppey anchorage berths.

The 140 km (87-mile) cable lies on the seabed protected by a covering of rocks or in a trench. Other users must not be disrupted, and a series of hazards must be avoided: anchorages, navigation channels, environmentally sensitive areas, known wrecks, moving sandbanks, unexploded ordnance, windfarms and other subsea cables. The route was chosen to take all this into account, and to turn south on the most western route to minimise cable length. In the Thames, it runs to the south of the Pan Sands sand bank and south of the BritNed interconnector cable.

In France the high-voltage direct current cable crosses the coastline in an industrial area owned by the Grand Maritime Port of Dunkerque (GMPD) and passes under their land for 10 km (6 miles) to a site alongside the RD11 junction (52a/b) with the A16 autoroute to the new converter station. The 400 kV alternating current link travels 3 km (2 miles) underground to the new Warande substation that is to be built adjacent to the existing RTE Bourbourg substation; they will share connection to the 400 kV alternating current overhead lines of the RTE.
