= Celtic Interconnector =

Power line under construction between France and Ireland

- Knockraha, Ireland and La Martyre, France

Location
- Country: Ireland, France
- Coordinates: 51°54′57″N 8°13′49″W; 48°26′36″N 4°11′50″W
- General direction: north-south
- From: Knockraha, Ireland
- Passes through: Celtic Sea
- To: La Martyre, France

Ownership information
- Partners: EirGrid, RTE

Construction information
- Expected: 2028

Technical information
- Type: submarine cable
- Current type: HVDC
- Total length: 575 km (357 mi)
- Capacity: 700 MW
- DC voltage: ± 320 kV

The Celtic Interconnector is a 700 MW high-voltage direct current (HVDC) submarine power cable under construction between the southern coast of Ireland and the north-west coast of Brittany. It will be the first such interconnector between the two countries.

Commissioning of the project is expected in spring 2028.

The director general of EirGrid stated in 2022 that the interconnector was arguably "the most important Irish infrastructure project for this decade".

== Current status ==
Laying of the undersea portion of the cable began in August 2025.

== Route ==
The cable is due to run between the Knockraha substation in County Cork, Ireland, to the La Martyre substation in Finistère, France.

Of its total length of 575 km (357 miles), 500 km (311 miles) will pass through Irish, British and French waters of the Celtic Sea.

== Technical specification ==
The electrical interconnector, which will be the first between the two countries, has a planned capacity of 700 MW.

The project also includes plans for a direct fibre optic communications link between Ireland and France.

== Construction fleet ==
The project's construction has required a fleet of specialised vessels. The offshore operation is led by cable-laying vessel Calypso, equipped with high capacity cable turntables capable of carrying 8,000 tons of HVDC cable, dynamic positioning and tension control systems to install the subsea cable. As the cable is buried, Calypso is supported by offshore support vessel Aethra, which carries out boulder clearance and trenching. Athena undertakes cable burial using jetting systems.

== Project promoters ==
The project is a joint venture between the Irish transmission system operator (TSO) EirGrid and French TSO Réseau de Transport d'Électricité (RTE) for the purpose of improving security of supply, reducing consumer electricity costs and supporting the development of renewable energy.

== Project economics ==
In 2016 the interconnector had an initial expected cost of €1 billion.

As of November 2022, the interconnector was expected to cost €1.6 billion. According to the then Taoiseach, Micheál Martin, "The Celtic Interconnector will bring tangible benefits to the citizens of both France and Ireland by promoting the use of renewable energy, bringing down electricity prices, and helping ensure security of energy supply".

== Project history ==
In July 2016, after completion of a feasibility study the two countries agreed to proceed with a two-year planning phase. This included an economic assessment, environmental considerations and will determine the placement of the cable and onshore stations, while a decision initially due on the project is foreseen for 2020 or 2021. In May 2018, the project was granted a foreshore license to begin marine surveys for the potential landing sites at Ballinwilling, Claycastle and Redbarn beaches, County Cork.

In 2018, the project was given preliminary approval for European Investment Bank funding as part of preparations by Ireland for Brexit, for €530 million.

By 2019, the project had been designated a European Project of Common Interest as part of the European Super Grid.

Three potential landing sites on the Cork coast were identified and six locations (Ballyadam, Leamlara, Knockraha, Pigeon Hill, Kilquane and Ballyvatta) were under consideration for the HVDC converter station.

By 2019, due to the potential impact of Brexit on electricity trading over the existing Ireland – UK HVDC interconnectors, planning for the Celtic Interconnector had accelerated.

In December 2020, EirGrid and RTE signed a €520 million European Commission funding agreement for the Celtic Interconnector.

As of 2021, the cable was expected to be operational in line with the original schedule, by 2026. In August 2021, the project was at step five in the planning process and was expected to continue until 2022.

In May 2022, An Bord Pleanála granted permission for the onshore portion of the project while in August 2022, the Department for Housing Local Government and Heritage granted the project a foreshore licence, an important permit for the undersea work involved.

On 14 September 2022, the UK Marine Management Organisation granted a licence for the project to proceed. This was the last major license required before Step 6 construction could start in late 2022.

In November 2022, final construction and finance agreements were signed off by the Irish and French governments at the Irish embassy in Paris with the interconnector "due to be completed and operational by 2026".

In October 2023 RTE had started work in La Martyre on the converter station there called Ar Merzher. The converter station is scheduled to be completed by 2026.

In January 2025, with the project having been underway for about 15 months, EirGrid announced the opening of the next phase of community benefit sharing for the Celtic Interconnector project.

By July 2025, the expected commissioning date for the project had slipped to spring of 2028.

== Consequences ==
On 19 March 2024, the existence of the Celtic Interconnector is taken into account in ACER Decision No 04/2024. The Celtic Interconnector will be included in an electricity capacity calculation region (CCR). This CCR previously named Core Europe should become Central Europe.

== See also ==
- Energy in Ireland
- Energy in France
- Electricity sector in Ireland
- Electricity sector in France
- Greenlink, cable connecting Ireland and Great Britain
