= Biomass in the United Kingdom =

Overview of biomass energy and biofuels in the United Kingdom

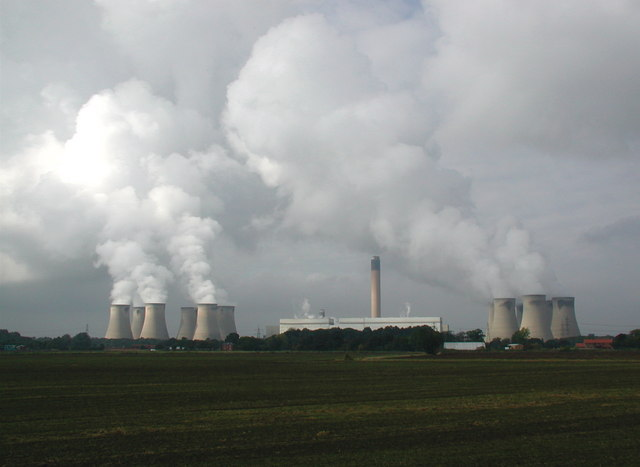
The 2.6 GW biomass Drax Power Station in North Yorkshire

British grid electricity in 2025
1. Wind (29.7%)
2. Nuclear (11.8%)
3. Biomass (6.90%)
4. Solar (6.50%)
5. Hydro (1.60%)
6. Storage (1.20%)
7. Imports (15.1%)
8. Natural gas (26.8%)

Biomass generated 40.1 TWh of electricity in the United Kingdom in 2024 – about 7.1% of total UK output – from 3.8 GW of dedicated plant biomass and co-firing capacity. The sector is dominated by large coal-to-biomass conversions such as Drax (2.6 GW) and Lynemouth (420 MW), with new plants planned such as the 299 MW Tees Renewable Energy Plant.

== History ==
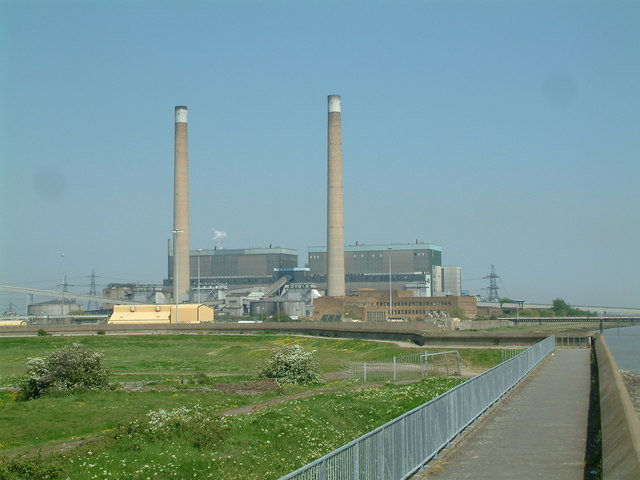
Tilbury B was the UK's first large-scale coal unit to trial 100 % biomass firing (2011–2013).

In 2003 Drax Power Station began co-firing biomass as a renewable alternative to coal.

- 2012 – the 750 MW Tilbury B hoped to become the world's largest biomass unit but was shut down in 2013.
- 2013–2018 – Drax converted three of its six 660 MW units and built four 80 000-t storage domes.
- 2021 – Coal generation fell below 2% of UK electricity; biomass overtook it for the first time.
- September 2024 – the final coal plant at Ratcliffe-on-Soar closed, leaving converted biomass as the only solid-fuel baseload option.

== Capacity and generation ==
vertical bar chart of between 2010 and 2024
Source: DESNZ Energy Trends 2025, Department for Energy Security & Net Zero. 27 March 2025. Retrieved 8 August 2025.

== Major biomass power stations ==
Station	Location	Output (MW)	Type	Fuel source	Notes
Drax	North Yorkshire	2 580	Conversion	Imported pellets (US SE; Canada)	Largest biomass plant in the world
Lynemouth Power Station	Northumberland	420	Conversion	Imported pellets	Full biomass since 2018
Snetterton	Norfolk	44	New build	Straw & chips	Supplies beet-sugar refinery
Wheldon Road CHP	Selby	75	CHP	Pellets	Supplies Drax rail unloading facility

== Heat sector ==
Heat production in the United Kingdom is dominated by fossil fuels - particularly natural gas - which together supply over 90% of heat; the contribution from biomass is modest at about 6%.

== Transport biofuels ==
Under the Renewable Transport Fuel Obligation (RTFO) suppliers blended 1.89 billion litres of sustainable liquid biofuel in 2024 (9.1% by energy).

== Economics and subsidies ==
Between 2012 and 2024 Drax alone received £11 billion in Renewable Obligation and CfD support; 2024 top-up payments totalled £869 million. Critics argue that burning imported wood is neither cost-effective nor carbon-neutral.

== Sustainability debate ==
A 2025 analysis by Ember found Drax emitted 13.3 Mt CO₂ in 2024 – more than the UK's six most carbon-intensive gas plants combined. NGOs and academics question the UK's carbon-accounting rules that rate imported biomass as zero-emission at the point of combustion. The proposed Tees Renewable Energy Plant is being challenged in court because of alleged environmental impacts.

== Policy and targets ==
The UK Biomass Strategy 2023 sets a hierarchy of uses favouring waste biomass and hard-to-electrify sectors and envisages up to 5 Mt CO₂ y⁻¹ of durable removals via BECCS by 2030.

== See also ==
- Renewable energy in the United Kingdom
- Bioenergy in the European Union
- Biofuel in the United Kingdom
- Energy policy of the United Kingdom
