= Northfleet Power Station =

Coal-fired power station in the UK

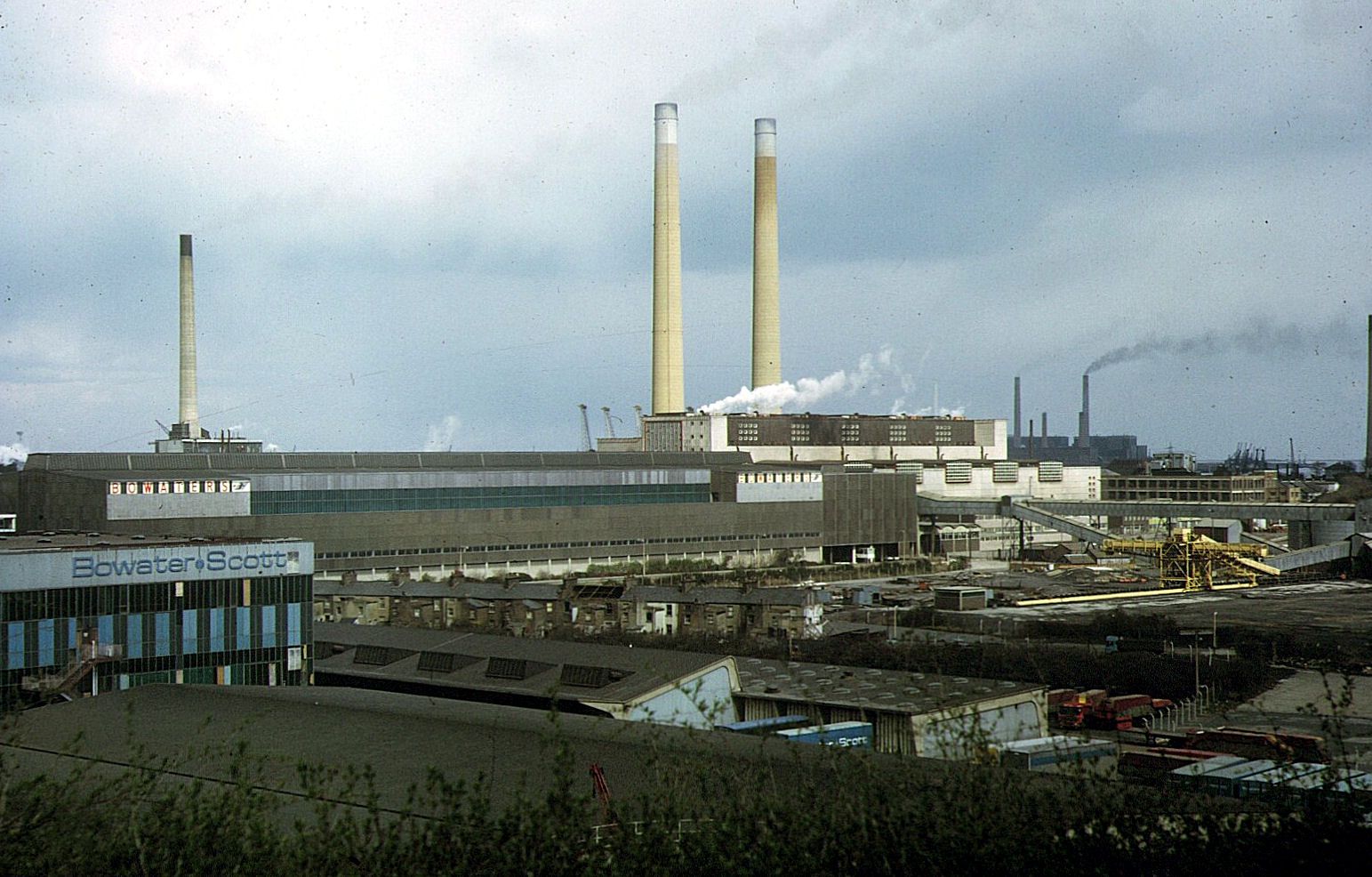
- Northfleet Power Station from the south-west, 1973.
- Country: England
- Location: Kent, South East England
- Coordinates: 51.445000°N 0.347000°E
- Status: Decommissioned and demolished
- Construction began: 1956
- Commission date: 1963
- Decommission date: 1991
- Owner: Central Electricity Generating Board
- Operator: CEGB

Thermal power station
- Primary fuel: Coal (until 1972), Oil (from 1972)
- Chimneys: 2 (153 metres)
- Cooling towers: None
- Cooling source: River water

Power generation
- Units operational: Six × 120 MW
- Make and model: GEC 120 MW
- Units decommissioned: All
- Nameplate capacity: 720 MW
- Annual net output: see graph in text

External links
- Commons: Related media on Commons

Northfleet Power Station was a 720 MW coal-fired, later oil-fired, power station on the south bank of the Thames at Northfleet, Kent. Formerly opened in 1963, it was converted to burn oil in 1972, and closed in 1991.

== History ==
The station was designed by the CEGB Southern Projects Group, and the principal consulting engineers were L.G. Mouchel and Partners. The station was built on three adjoining sites: Site A comprising the main buildings; Site B a former chalk quarry was used as an open coal store; and Site C further to the south was used to dump waste ash and dust. The main building was clad in an asbestos and aggregate cladding. It comprised a long east–west rectangular boiler house and a lower and longer turbine hall to the south.

The station formally opened in 1963 but its first unit was commissioned January 1960 and contained six 120 MW generating units. The first set was ordered in 1955, under erection in 1958, and an order for two further sets followed early in 1956 set 4 in 1957 and the final two in 1959. The six machines are all of similar design were supplied General Electric Co with steam conditions of 1,500 lb/sq in and 1,000 deg F, with reheat to 1,000 deg F. The alternator rating is 150,000 kVA at 0.8 pf (power factor) and were cooled by hydrogen. The rotor is cooled by hydrogen passed through hollow copper conductors, permitting the construction of a machine of relatively small overall dimensions.

A 120 MW Unit comprised a coal-fired (later oil-fired) boiler supplying high-pressure steam to a GEC three-cylinder reheat steam turbine, which in turn powered a GEC hydrogen-cooled 120 MW alternator. Each unit had its own control room interposed between the boiler and turbine staffed by a unit operator and an assistant unit operator. They in turn were assisted by two auxiliary plant attendants, one for the boiler, the other for the turbine plant. Data logging equipment was the first to be installed in the UK and provided a continuous scan of plant conditions. The electrical output of each unit, and therefore the station, was co-ordinated by a single load dispatch office who were in contact with grid control at East Grinstead. The electrical output of the station was routed by cables and overhead conductors to two grid sub stations, Northfleet East and Northfleet West, where the station fed the national grid.

At full load each boiler consumed 50 tonnes of coal per hour, which was delivered by ship, first to a coal yard then to bunkers that fed cylindrical ball mills to create pulverised fuel, which was then blown into the boiler furnace. The maximum total production of steam from the boilers was 5,160,000 lb/hr (650 kg/s), the steam conditions at the turbine stop valves was 538 °C at 1500 psi (103.4 bar). The design of this station can be considered the founding development of ever larger boiler / turbine units. From 1963 to 1965 Northfleet was amongst the UK's 20 power stations with the highest thermal efficiencies; its thermal efficiency was 33.67 per cent.

From a coal-burning station, it was converted to burn oil in 1972. The station closed in 1991.

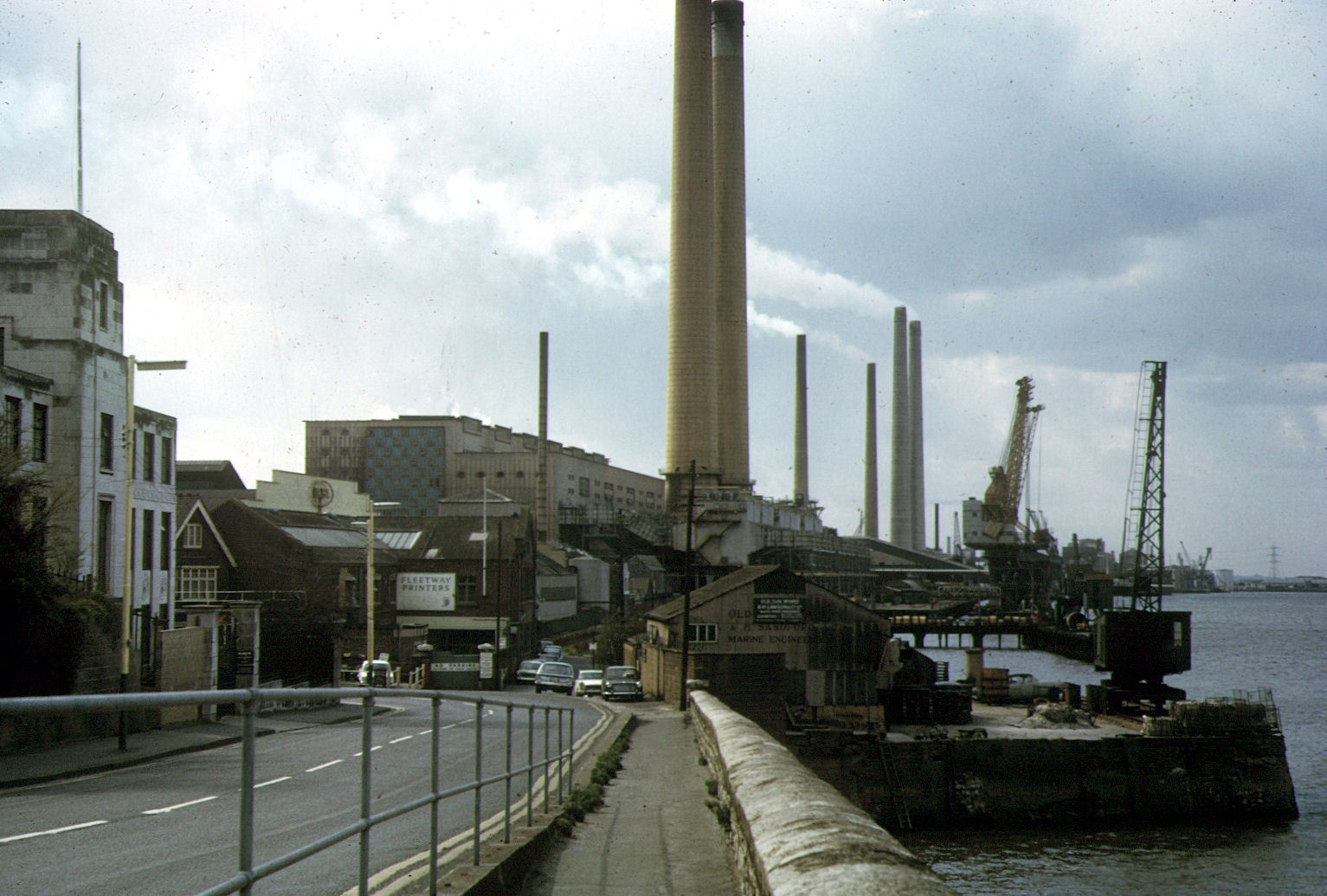
Northfleet Power Station seen from the east, 1973.

In 2000 the Government gave permission to Scottish and Southern Energy plc to build a 110 MW gas-fired combined heat and power station to supply the heat and electricity needs of the Kimberly-Clark paper mill at Northfleet.

=== Electricity output ===
Electricity output for Northfleet power station over the period 1961-1987 was as follows.

Northfleet annual electricity output GWh
