= Imera (company) =

Imera N.V.
- Company type: Subsidiary of Oceanteam ASA
- Predecessor: Imera Power; Hydragrid
- Defunct: 30 January 2010
- Headquarters: Dublin, Ireland; Amsterdam, Netherlands
- Key people: H. Halbesma (former Chairman); Grace Samodal (former COO)
- Parent: Oceanteam Energy NV
- Divisions: Imera Ltd.
- Subsidiaries: East West Cable One Ltd. (formerly affiliated company)

Imera was a subsidiary of Norwegian offshore services company Oceanteam ASA located in Dublin and Amsterdam. The company was created by merger of a privately owned Irish company Imera Power and Hydragrid, a subsidiary of Oceanteam. Oceanteam owned a 70% stake in the company.

Imera was the promoter of the East–West Interconnector project across Irish Sea between Ireland and Wales. It also proposed the BelBrit interconnector between the United Kingdom and Belgium.

In January 2009, Imera announced plans to build Europagrid, an electricity grid connecting multiple European nations and offshore wind farm projects.

In 2009, it was published that the East West Interconnector did not receive EU grant aid to secure financing. Following this, Oceanteam divested its entire shareholding in Imera in December 2009.
