= Ballycronan More =

Townland in County Antrim, Northern Ireland

Coordinates: 54°50′40″N 5°46′06″W

- Location within Northern Ireland
- County: County Antrim
- Country: Northern Ireland
- Sovereign state: United Kingdom
- Post town: LARNE
- Postcode district: BT40
- Dialling code: 028

Ballycronan More is a townland of 356 acres in County Antrim, Northern Ireland. It is situated in the civil parish of Islandmagee and the historic barony of Belfast Lower.

The HVDC Moyle Interconnector is the HVDC link between Auchencrosh, South Ayrshire in Scotland and Ballycronan More, County Antrim, which went into service in 2001. It is owned and operated by Mutual Energy. The Static Inverter Plant is sited in Ballycronan More.

== See also ==
- List of townlands in County Antrim
