= Sea Link =

Sea Link is a proposed HVDC submarine power cable to be constructed by National Grid between Suffolk and Kent in the United Kingdom. As part of the Great Grid Upgrade, it would connect offshore wind and nuclear power supply to meet forecast demand.

Onshore substations and converter stations are proposed at Saxmundham in Suffolk and Minster in Kent.
