= Knockraha =

Human settlement in County Cork, Ireland

Knockraha Irish: Cnoc Rátha
- Village
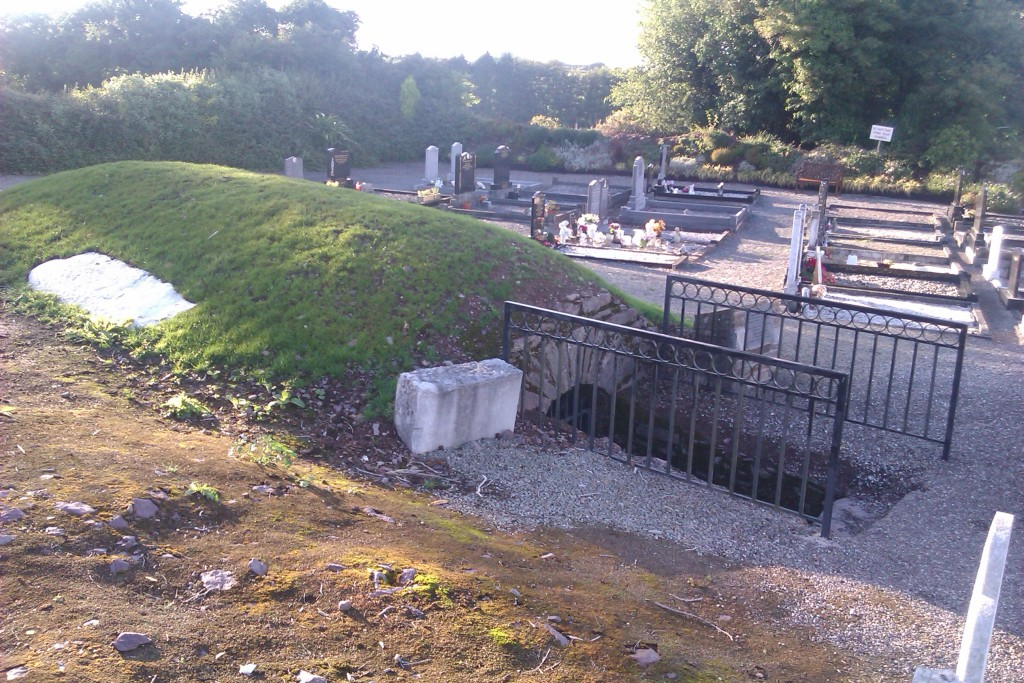
- The 'Sing Sing' prison cell in Kilquane cemetery, 1km north of Knockraha village

- Location in Ireland
- Coordinates: 51.959°N 8.34°W
- Country: Ireland
- Province: Munster
- County: County Cork
- Dáil Constituency: Cork East
- EU Parliament: South

Population (2022)
  - Total: 517

Knockraha (Irish: Cnoc Rátha, meaning 'rath hill') is a small village in east County Cork, Ireland. It is around 12 kilometres (7 mi) north-east of Cork city. The village had a population of 517 as of the 2022 census.

== History ==
The name Knockraha means "fort (rath) hill" or "hill of the forts". This refers to a collection of forts that stood on a hill (known locally as Carthy's Hill) between Knockraha East and Knockraha West.

Knockraha is within the Roman Catholic parish of Glounthaune, which was formed in the late 19th century with the amalgamation of the historical ecclesiastical parishes of Ballylucra, Ballyvinney, Caherlag, Killaspugmillane and Kilquane. The latter parish of Kilquane stretched from Glenmore Bridge to Watergrasshill village and was centred on the church in what is now Kilquane Cemetery. Tradition holds that Saint Cuan founded Kilquane, which means 'church of Cuán', and there are several other Kilquanes elsewhere in Munster. Cuan was possibly a passing missionary, like Saint Patrick, who brought Christianity to the area.

The village is within the Dáil constituency of Cork East.
