= Greenlink =

Submarine HVDC interconnector between the UK and Ireland

Greenlink Interconnector
- County Wexford, Ireland and Pembrokeshire, Wales

Location
- Country: Ireland, United Kingdom
- General direction: east-west
- From: Ireland
- Passes through: St George's Channel
- To: Wales

Construction information
- Commissioned: 29 January 2025

Technical information
- Type: Submarine cable
- Current type: HVDC
- Total length: 190 km (120 mi)
- Capacity: 500 MW
- AC voltage: 400 kV (UK); 220 kV (Ireland)
- DC voltage: 320 kV

Greenlink is a 190 km long 500 MW high-voltage direct current (HVDC) submarine power cable between County Wexford in Ireland and Pembrokeshire in Wales.

== Route ==
The cable runs between EirGrid's Great Island substation in County Wexford, and National Grid's Pembroke substation in Pembrokeshire, with the cable making landfall at Baginbun Beach near Fethard-on-Sea in Ireland and at Freshwater West beach near Castlemartin in Wales. The total length is 200 km (120 miles), of which 160 km (100 miles) is under the sea.

== Specification ==
The HVDC link is configured as a symmetrical monopole, with DC voltages of ±320 kV, and nominal power rating of 500 MW. The project is expected to cost €400 million.

== Project history ==
Subsea surveys were undertaken in 2018, and public consultations in 2019.

In 2026 it was widely reported that during the project design phase, the landfall at Freshwater West beach in Pembrokeshire had to be re-routed to avoid the fictional grave of Dobby the House Elf from the Harry Potter films.

In April 2020, the Greenlink Interconnector Limited submitted three planning applications for onshore construction in Wales. The project still required planning permission and marine licences in both the United Kingdom and in Ireland, but the process of procuring construction contracts had started.

In March 2021, the project was granted a licence to install the sea cable in UK waters, with a similar licence for Irish waters still pending. As of March 2021, commissioning of the interconnector was planned for the end of 2023.

In January 2022, construction work on converter stations started. In March 2022, the company announced that it had reached financial close, and offshore construction commenced in May 2022. Construction and trial operation was completed in August 2024, with testing of the link commencing in December 2024 and full operations beginning on 29 January 2025. The link was officially launched in April 2025.

In March 2025, Partners Group agreed to sell Greenlink Interconnector to Equitix and Baltic Cable AB in a transaction valuing the project at more than €1 billion. Partners Group, which had acquired a controlling stake in 2019 and full ownership in 2021, had overseen the project's development and construction through to the commencement of commercial operations. The acquisition marked the transition to new ownership as Greenlink entered its operational phase.

In June 2026, Mubadala Investment Company agreed to acquire a stake of approximately US$200 million in Greenlink, joining existing shareholders Equitix and Baltic Cable AB in a partnership that established joint control of the project. The transaction expanded the ownership group following the interconnector's transition to commercial operations in 2025. Equitix chief investment officer Achal Bhuwania said: “We are pleased to partner with Mubadala on this investment in Greenlink, which reflects our shared focus on high-quality, strategically important infrastructure”.

== See also ==
- Energy in Ireland
- Energy in the United Kingdom
- Electricity sector in Ireland
- Electricity sector in the United Kingdom
- Moyle Interconnector and East–West Interconnector, existing 500 MW interconnectors across the Irish Sea
- Celtic Interconnector, 700 MW cable project to connect Ireland and France
