= Moyle Interconnector =

Electrical connection between Northern Ireland and Scotland

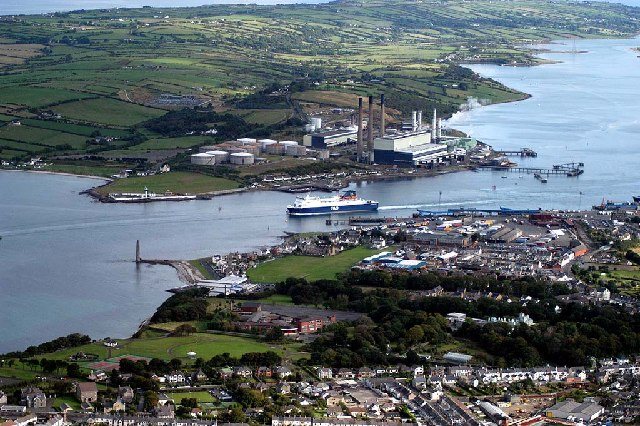
- Aerial view of Islandmagee, showing Ballylumford power station and the nearby Ballycronan More convertor station
- Map of Moyle Interconnector

Location
- Country: United Kingdom (Scotland & N. Ireland)
- From: Auchencrosh, South Ayrshire
- To: Ballycronan More, County Antrim

Ownership information
- Owner: Mutual Energy

Construction information
- Commissioned: 2001

Technical information
- Type: Submarine cable
- Current type: HVDC
- Total length: 63.5 km (39.5 mi)
- Capacity: 500 MW
- DC voltage: 250 kV
- No. of poles: 2

The Moyle Interconnector is a 500 megawatt (MW) HVDC link between Scotland and Northern Ireland, running between Auchencrosh in Ayrshire and Ballycronan More in County Antrim. It went into service in 2001 and is owned and operated by Mutual Energy.

== Specifications ==
The Moyle Interconnector has a capacity of 500 MW and is of dual monopole configuration. Each pole consists of a coaxial 250 kV DC cable with integrated return conductors (IRC), each cable having a transmission capacity of 250 MW. The LV return conductor elements of the IRCs have suffered failures (see below), and their function was restored by laying new separate metallic return conductors (MRCs) in 2016. The converter stations were designed and constructed by Siemens, and were the first to feature Siemens light-triggered thyristors.

Moyle is a Line Commutated Converter (LCC) design; as a result, it cannot offer Black Start capability, unlike Voltage Sourced Converters. However LCC technology offers lower losses and hence more efficient power transfer.

The cable system was manufactured by Nexans in Halden, Norway, who also carried out installation.

The converter station at Auchencrosh is connected via a 64 km (40-mile) single-circuit 275 kV overhead three-phase AC line, which is installed on delta-type towers, to Coylton substation. The connection to Northern Ireland is then made through dual 63.5 km (39.5-mile) long monopolar cables, of which 55 km (34 miles) are submarine cables. The Ballycronan More converter station is connected into the Northern Ireland grid through two 275 kV overhead line circuits.

== Operating history ==
In August 2011, the interconnector went out of service. Repairs were made and the cable became operational again with 450 MW in February 2012.

However, further faults meant that a major part of the interconnector had to be taken out of service until it could be augmented with the addition of new LV return cables, completed in 2016. This restored capacity to the full 500 MW. This was carried out by Nexans (Norway) with the aid of Morrows (NI) and Romac Civil Engineering (NI). The new LV cables replaced the LV elements of the original co-axial cables on the subsea sections of cable. The original cables remain as installed for the land sections, with the HV elements remaining in service for the subsea sections. The new cables are joined into the original cables at transition joints on each coast.

In February 2017, one HV cable suffered a further fault, halving capacity to 250 MW. However full capacity was restored in September 2017, following repairs by Nexans.

A major refurbishment of the control and protection systems was undertaken in 2022; this was delivered pole by pole, allowing 250 MW capacity to be maintained for most of the project. The new controls support enhanced ancillary services as well as more resilient operation in low fault level conditions.

== Mutual Energy ==
Mutual Energy is a mutual company which manages the Moyle Interconnector (and some high pressure gas transmission assets including the Scotland-Northern Ireland Pipeline) for the benefit of Northern Ireland's energy consumers.

== Economic aspects ==
Exports to Scotland had historically been limited to 80 MW due to National Grid UK transmission constraints. With the increase in renewable energy on the Northern Irish and Irish grids, Mutual Energy worked with National Grid to increase export capacity. Two-day ahead projections of wind in Scotland were used to allow flows of up to 300 MW. The 80 MW constraint was reduced in stages, with firm export capacity being increased to 250 MW, and then finally to 500 MW in 2021.

Moyle also provides frequency support services to both System Operator for Northern Ireland (SONI) and National Grid. These services provide for fast change of power flow in the event of a network disturbance on either the NI or Scotland transmission systems.

== Sites ==
Site	Coordinates
Coylton substation	55°26′49″N 4°25′52″W
Auchencrosh converter station	55°4′10″N 4°58′50″W
Ballycronan More converter station	54°50′34″N 5°46′11″W

== See also ==
- East–West Interconnector
- Scotland–Norway interconnector
- BritNed
- Greenlink
