= East–West Interconnector =

Power cable connecting Ireland and the UK

- Location of Eirgrid East–West Interconnector

Location
- Country: United Kingdom, Ireland
- General direction: East–West
- From: Shotton, North Wales 53°13′38″N 3°4′22″W
- Passes through: Irish Sea
- To: Rush North Beach, County Dublin 53°28′16″N 6°34′3″W

Ownership information
- Partners: EirGrid

Construction information
- Cable manufacturer: ABB
- Substation manufacturer: ABB
- Construction started: 2010
- Commissioned: 2012

Technical information
- Type: submarine cable
- Current type: HVDC Light
- Total length: 261 km (162 mi)
- Capacity: 500 MW
- AC voltage: 400 kV
- DC voltage: ±200 kV
- No. of circuits: 1

The East–West Interconnector is a 500 MW high-voltage direct current submarine and subsoil power cable from 2012 which connects the Irish and British electricity markets, between Dublin and the Wales/England border. The project was developed by the Irish national grid operator EirGrid.

== Aim ==
The interconnector is aimed to increase competition and security of supply, and better use the capacity of wind energy. The additional capacity headroom provided by the interconnection will assist in reducing the Electricity Supply Board's dominant position in the Irish electricity market. By joining the two markets it will allow Irish suppliers to access power in the British mainland market and for British suppliers to enter the Irish market without initially having to commit to large capital expenditure, significantly reducing barriers to entry. Irish renewable generators will benefit from the interconnection as it will increase their available market and may make it more economically attractive to construct more large scale renewable generation.

ESB Power Generation announced in 2007 its intention to withdraw approximately 1,300 MW of capacity by 2010. This would effectively reduce the installed capacity of fully dispatchable plant from 6,437 MW to 5,150 MW. This closure of older inefficient power plants, such as a 461 MW fossil fuel capacity at Poolbeg Generating Station Dublin, and coupled with the high growth demand forecasts presented, created a major threat to the security of the Irish electricity grid.

The interconnection will enhance security of supply and grid stability on both countries and create conditions suitable for the development of a new regional market. The European Commission expressed the view that European electricity markets would benefit from further interconnection investments. The EU Trans-European Networks project has classified the UK–Irish Interconnector as a priority project.

== Location ==
At 262 km (163 miles) in length, 186 km (116 miles) of which is beneath the Irish Sea, the East West Interconnector links the electricity transmission grids of Ireland and Great Britain, from converter stations at Portan in Ireland to Shotton in Wales.

== History ==
Studies for the UK–Irish interconnection date back to the 1970s when the Irish Electricity Supply Board first examined the possibility of linking the UK and Irish electricity grids. Further studies were conducted in the early 1990s and a joint study was recently conducted between Electricity Supply Board and National Grid plc with the support of the European Union.

In 2004 the Commission for Energy Regulation on request of the Irish Government sought proposals from the private sector to construct two 500 MW merchant interconnectors between Ireland and Wales. A private project was established by Imera Power who was contracted to develop two 350 MW interconnectors through its affiliate East West Cable One Ltd. in 2006.

In 2006 the Minister for Communications, Energy and Natural Resources, instructed the Commission for Energy Regulation to commence the development of a regulated interconnector of 500 MW as it was deemed to be critical infrastructure.

Eirgrid commenced work on the East West Interconnector in 2007. It was completed in 2012 and on 20 September 2012 it was inaugurated in Batterstown, County Meath by UK Secretary of State for Energy and Climate Change Ed Davey, Irish Taoiseach Enda Kenny and European Commissioner for Energy Günther Oettinger.

On 8 September 2016, the interconnector had a fault that occurred during an annual maintenance at the converter station in County Meath. The maintenance was carried out by contractor ABB. The interconnector re-entered service on 20 December 2016 with a fully rated 500 MW import, however exports to the UK were still limited to roughly 280 MW. As of June 2017, the cable offered full capacity in both directions. In March 2022, following a planned 3 week shutdown, the interconnector remained at below 1% capacity for an ongoing period.

== Technical features ==
The Eirgrid East–West Interconnector has a total length of 261 km (162 miles), of which 186 km (116 miles) is submarine cable and 75 kilometres (47 mi) is subsoil cable. The link connects converter stations at Rush North Beach, County Dublin, Ireland, and Shotton Converter Station, Deeside, Wales. The interconnection uses ±200 kV HVDC Light cables with a capacity of 500 MW. It is the first HVDC Light transmission system project, to use ±200 kV cables. The cables and converter stations were provided by ABB. The project was financed by a €300 million loan from the European Investment Bank, capital investments from commercial banks, EirGrid equity and a €110 million grant from the European Commission.

== East West Cable One project - abandoned proposal ==
A competing project was undertaken by East West Cable One (EW1), also known as the East West Interconnector. The EW1 cable with a capacity of 350 MW was to be connected at Arklow substation in County Wicklow and Pentir Substation near Bangor in North Wales. The second cable known as EW2 was a second phase project with a capacity of 350–500 MW was proposed between Wexford and Pembroke.

Both developments were to be funded by the private sector on commercial basis; their costs would not be recovered by system tariffs for all end users in either UK or Ireland, but rather by the users of the cable, large wholesale energy traders. Corresponding exemption from the third party access rule was granted by the European Commission on 23 November 2009 for 25 years for phase one and 20 years for phase two.

Since 2016, the associated websites for these projects have been mothballed.

== Eirgrid Interconnector sites ==
Site	Coordinates
Shotton static inverter plant	53°13′38″N 3°4′22″W
Cable enters sea	53°20′41″N 3°24′8″W
Cable leaves sea	53°31′29″N 6°4′56″W
Woodland HVDC static inverter	53°28′16″N 6°34′3″W

== See also ==
- Moyle Interconnector
- Western HVDC Link
- Greenlink
