= EirGrid =

Irish utility company

EirGrid plc
- Type: State-owned public limited company
- Industry: Electricity
- Founded: 7 February 2001; 25 years ago
- Founder: Government of Ireland
- Headquarters: The Oval, 160 Shelbourne Road, Ballsbridge, Dublin 4, Dublin, Ireland
- Area served: Ireland
- Key people: Cathal Marley (Chief Executive); Brendan Tuohy (Chair of the Board)
- Services: Electricity transmission system operator (TSO)
- Revenue: €688m
- Operating income: €32.1m
- Net income: €11.9m
- Total assets: €1,348m
- Total equity: €323m
- Owner: Government of Ireland
- Number of employees: 462
- Subsidiaries: SONI (System Operator for Northern Ireland)
- Website: www.eirgrid.ie

EirGrid plc is the state-owned electric power transmission operator in Ireland. It is a public limited company registered under the Companies Acts; its shares are held by the Minister for Climate, Energy and the Environment. It is one of a number of Irish state-sponsored bodies and is regulated by the Commission for Regulation of Utilities.

== History ==
EirGrid was established under Irish and European laws including the European Communities (Internal Market in Electricity) Regulations, 2000, to enable competition in the Irish power sector. It took over operation of the national power system on 1 July 2006. The ESB (the Electricity Supply Board) currently holds ownership of the physical assets.

The transmission assets constitute 6,500 km of overhead line and underground cable, as well as over 100 bulk substations. The system's significance for competition is that most large independent generators connect to the transmission system and utilise it to transport their power to all regions. EirGrid also operates the wholesale power market.

== Role ==
EirGrid's primary purposes are the daily management of the Irish national grid, the operation of the wholesale power market, and the development of high voltage infrastructure to serve Ireland's economy. The Irish National Grid is a 3-phase wide area synchronous grid that is not synchronised with the GB's National Grid. The high voltage transmission system has been likened to "motorways for power" or "broadband power" providing electricity in high quality and in bulk to all regions. Transmission is seen as a key factor in facilitating inward investment by bodies like the Industrial Development Authority (IDA) and the development body Forfas. It is also seen as critical to increased renewable energy by organisations like Sustainable Energy Ireland (SEI) and the Irish Wind Energy Association (IWEA). EirGrid is currently developing a large number of major transmission projects. It is working with the regulator in line with Irish Government policy to develop a second major transmission line to Northern Ireland. The 500 MW East–West Interconnector linking the Irish power system to Great Britain was commissioned in 2012. EirGrid will own that interconnector after it is developed, under the Irish Government decision.

EirGrid has its own separate board and is regulated by the Commission for Regulation of Utilities (the CRU) and its shares are held by the Irish Government. EirGrid is responsible for balancing electricity consumption and generation, for the safe, secure and economical operation of the power system, and for the planning and development of the Irish power grid. Under the Single Electricity Market, EirGrid operates the wholesale power market on the island of Ireland with System Operator for Northern Ireland (SONI), which it now owns. More information on the functions of EirGrid, along with graphs of electricity demand/wind generation output updated every 15 minutes, are available on its website. Information on the Single Electricity Market Operator (SEMO) is also at that website.

== See also ==
- Electricity Supply Board
- List of high-voltage transmission links in Ireland
