= Painted frieze of the Bodleian Library =

The painted frieze at the Bodleian Library, in Oxford, United Kingdom, is a series of 202 portrait heads in what is now the Upper Reading Room. It was made in 1619, and the choice of worthies to include was advanced for its time, featuring Copernicus and Paracelsus as well as Protestant reformers. The portraits have been attributed to the London guild painter Thomas Knight; they were taken from at least ten different sources, according to current views.

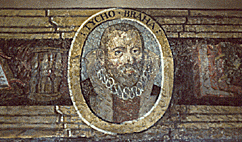
Head of Tycho Brahe from the Bodleian frieze.

The frieze was painted directly onto stonework (rather than by fresco technique), and its condition deteriorated despite restoration in the 18th century. It was plastered over in 1830, and rediscovered in 1949.

== Background ==
What is now the Upper Reading Room, on the top storey of the Library, was referred to by contemporaries as the "gallery". It has been suggested therefore that the initial conception was similar to a long gallery. Nowell Myres pointed out in one of his articles on the frieze that such instructive decoration by portraits in a library or museum was well known from the Giovio Series. Precedents from England of the 16th century were portrait series of bishops of Chichester, and founders of Peterhouse, Cambridge. Earlier precedents included portrait series of various groups such as, above all, saints, the Ancestors of Christ in a Tree of Jesse or other arrangement, or the Kings of France sculpted on the facade of Notre Dame. The Nine Worthies usually appeared in secular contexts. The Nine Worthies of London, proposed in 1592, cannot be said to have caught on. Later British examples include the Frieze of Parnassus (1864–72) at the base of the Albert Memorial in London, and the painted processional frieze of famous Scots in the entrance hall of the Scottish National Portrait Gallery (1898).

Portrait collections in books (the book of icones) became one of the recognised genres of collecting and collation for Renaissance humanists, along with the emblem book and album amicorum. The literary tradition of de viris illustribus found in this way its visual expression, typically known by the Italian term uomini illustri. The Bodleian heads, as in other places, served to join knowledge of the Christian and classical traditions.

== Content and layout ==
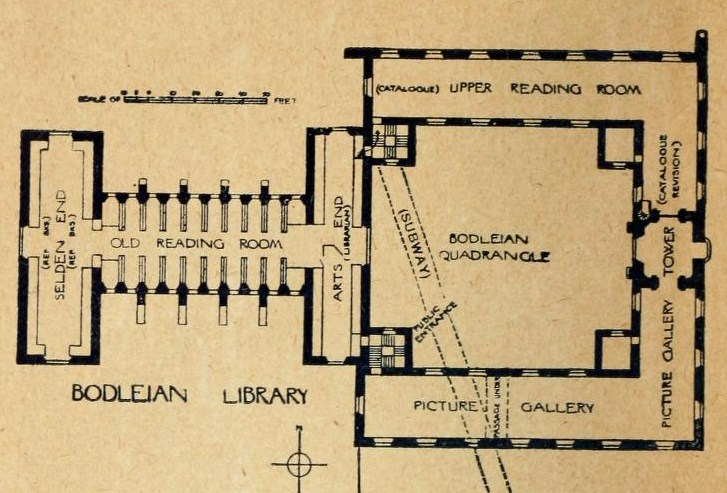
Map of the Bodleian Library, 1919.

The frieze was painted in 1619. Its content came from Thomas Bodley (who had died in 1613) and the direction of his book collecting; but also represented the views of Thomas James, the first librarian. Theologically it portrays the Church of England as a continuation of the Catholic dissidents John Wyclif, Jan Hus, Savonarola, and Erasmus. The Protestant Reformation is strongly represented, and John Rainolds, the learned Oxford conforming Puritan, is included.

The portrait heads are located high on the walls of the U-shaped floor, running above the windows, with paintings several feet apart spaced out by images mainly of books. There is a division by the topics on which the authors wrote, corresponding to the university disciplines of the time. The theological display is on the southern flank; the northern side's authors refer to the Faculty of Arts.

== List of the heads ==
Thomas Hearne took detailed notes of the frieze in 1725. His list and copies of inscriptions were basic to the modern restoration; one head remains unidentified. Hearne listed 200 heads (the single woman being Sappho) where in fact there are 202. As found in Hearne the heads are:

1. Cyril of Alexandria
2. Theodoret
3. Athanasius
4. Prosper of Aquitaine
5. ?
6. probably Pope Gregory I
7. Bede
8. Isidore of Seville
9. Alcuin
10. Anselm
11. Robert Grosseteste
12. Rabanus Maurus
13. John Damascenus
14. Thomas Aquinas
15. Peter Lombard
16. Jean Gerson
17. Konrad Pellecanus
18. Tostatus
19. Arias Montanus
20. Rhenanus
21. Leo Jud
22. Ulrich Hutenus
23. Lambert Danaeus
24. Heinrich Bullinger
25. Martin Chemnitz
26. George III, Prince of Anhalt-Dessau
27. Martin Bucer
28. Paul Fagius
29. Andreas Hyperius
30. Matthias Flacius Illyricus
31. Rudolf Gualther
32. Ludwig Lavater
33. Wolfgang Musculus
34. Augustin Marlorat
35. Johannes Oecolampadius
36. Huldrych Zwingli
37. Thomas Holland
38. Peter Martyr
39. Philipp Melanchthon
40. John Calvin
41. Guilhem Farel
42. Peter Viretus
43. Theodore Beza
44. Philips of Marnix, Lord of Saint-Aldegonde
45. Hieronymus Zanchius
46. Franciscus Junius the Elder
47. John Rainolds
48. Laurence Humphrey
49. Desiderius Erasmus
50. Martin Luther
51. Andreas Vesalius
52. Aulus Cornelius Celsus
53. Andreas Mathiolus
54. Girolamo Cardano
55. Paracelsus
56. Dioscorides
57. Avicenna
58. Galenus
59. Hippocrates
60. Aesclepius
61. Justinian
62. Andreas Tiraquellus
63. Accursius
64. Andreas Alciatus
65. Guillaume Budé
66. Jason Maynus (Giasone del Maino)
67. Paulus de Castro
68. Johannes de Imola
69. Petrus de Ancharano
70. Baldus de Ubaldis
71. Aesop
72. Hesiod
73. Homer
74. Berosus
75. Sappho
76. Linus
77. Solon
78. Euclid
79. Theophrastus
80. Socrates + omission by Hearne
81. Pindar
82. Virgil
83. Simonides
84. Ptolemy
85. Plutarch
86. Horace
87. Marcus Terentius Varro
88. Justinus
89. Livy
90. Boethius
91. Pliny
92. Seneca the Younger
93. Zonaras
94. Marcus Aurelius
95. Strabo
96. Alexander Aphrodiseus
97. Porphyrius
98. Johannes de Sacro Bosco
99. Ludovico Ariosto
100. Bartolomeo Platina
101. Thucydides
102. Sophocles
103. Euripides
104. Isocrates + Theocritus
105. Aratus
106. Sallust
107. Terence
108. taken as Alfonso V of Aragon the Magnanimous
109. Roger Bacon
110. Philippe de Commines
111. Albert Krantzius
112. Johannes Aventinus
113. Francesco Guicciardini
114. Paulus Jovius
115. Polydore Vergil
116. Gerardus Mercator
117. Abraham Ortelius
118. Justus Lipsius
119. Petrus Ramus
120. Joseph Scaliger
121. Sir Philip Sidney
122. Julius Caesar Scaliger
123. Giovanni Pico della Mirandola
124. Guillaume du Bartas
125. Tycho Brahe
126. Janus Douza
127. Adolf van Meetkercke
128. Juan Luis Vives
129. Petrus Apianus
130. Nicolas Copernicus
131. Johannes Sleidanus
132. Cornelius Agrippa
133. Poliziano
134. Lorenzo Valla
135. Libanius
136. Sabellicus
137. Johannes Regiomontanus
138. Martial
139. Lucan
140. Persius
141. Juvenal
142. Ovid
143. Geoffrey Chaucer
144. Gian Francesco Poggio Bracciolini
145. Petrarch
146. Dante
147. Leonardo Aretino
148. Giovanni Boccaccio
149. Cicero
150. Archimedes
151. Aristotle
152. Plato
153. Pythagoras
154. Diogenes
155. Aeschines
156. Herodotus
157. Aristophanes
158. Bartolus Saxoferratus
159. Azo of Bologna
160. John Case
161. Johannes Heurnius
162. John Bale
163. John Foxe
164. Robert Abbot
165. Thomas Bilson
166. John Jewel
167. John Whitgift
168. Alexander Nowell
169. Thomas Cranmer
170. Herbert Westphaling
171. Richard Eedes
172. Thomas Sparkes
173. John Spenser
174. Savonarola
175. Jerome of Prague
176. Jan Hus
177. John Wyclif
178. Pierre d'Ailly
179. Nicholas of Lyra
180. Duns Scotus
181. Bernard of Clairvaux
182. John Chrysostom
183. Augustine of Hippo
184. Rufinus
185. Jerome
186. Gregory of Nazianzus
187. Ambrose of Milan
188. Ephrem the Syrian
189. Epiphanius
190. Basil of Caesarea
191. Hilary of Poitiers
192. Eusebius
193. Dionysius of Alexandria
194. Cyprian
195. Origen
196. Tertullian
197. Clement of Alexandria
198. Justin Martyr
199. Philo
200. Dionysius the Areopagite

== Sources for the heads ==
The collection was eclectic in terms of its models, but four major sources in books for the iconography of the heads have been identified. Other books were involved, according to current scholarship, and accessible English portraits in some cases.

The Pourtraits et vies des hommes illustres (Paris 1584) of André Thévet was used for many of the Church Fathers and medieval theologians, and some of the classical authors. The Icones virorum illustrium series of volumes of 50 (Frankfurt, from 1598) of Jean-Jacques Boissard and Theodore de Bry supplied many models for the heads of humanists. The strongly Protestant collection of Jacobus Verheiden (The Hague 1602) was a source for many of the reformers, where the engraver was Hendrik Hondius I. Other classical authors and humanists were taken from the Opus chronographicum of Pieter van Opmeer (Antwerp 1611): its posthumous edition contained woodcut illustrations in the style of portrait medals.

The restorers of the 1950s used some other sources from the period, including Theodore Beza's Icones (Geneva 1580), and Enrico Bacco's Effigie di tutti i re che han dominato il reame di Naoli (Naples 1602) for the head of Alphonso of Aragon. The original source for the head of St. Ephrem is not known; as for other heads of Church Fathers, the restorers used the 1624 work of Raphael Custos, Patrologia, id est Descriptio S. Patrum Graecorum & Latinorum, qui in Augustana Bibliotheca visuntur.
