= Cork East =

Cork East or East Cork may refer to one of two parliamentary constituencies in County Cork, Ireland:

- Cork East (Dáil constituency) (1981–)
- East Cork (UK Parliament constituency) (1885–1922)

See also

- East Cork
