= East Cork Early Music Festival =

Irish arts festival

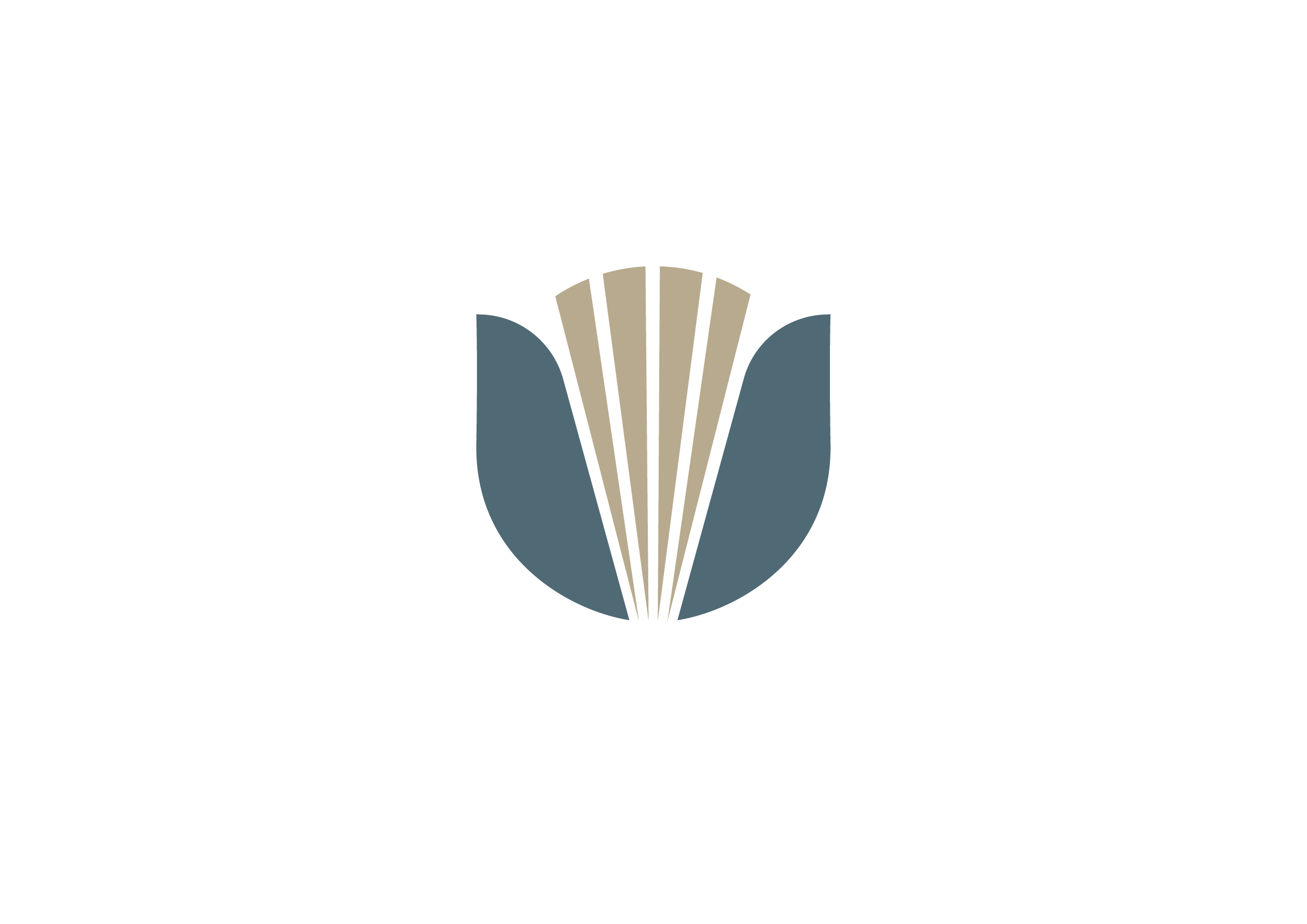
- Genre: Early music festival
- Frequency: Annual
- Locations: East Cork, Ireland
- Years active: 2003-present
- Website: eastcorkearlymusic.ie

East Cork Early Music Festival is an Irish arts festival that is intended to "promote the performance and appreciation" of music written before 1750 on period instruments. Formed in 2003 under the artistic direction of Sarah Cunningham, the festival takes place in the East Cork area during the autumn (usually at the beginning of October). It features concerts, lectures, workshops and other events related to early music.

East Cork Early Music Festival has included events in local landmark buildings such as St. Fin Barre’s Cathedral, Fota House, the Grainstore at Ballymaloe, the Collegiate Church in Youghal and Cloyne Cathedral. Other events have taken place in the Curtis Auditorium and Stack Theatre in the Cork School of Music. In October 2017, the festival established a partnership with Nano Nagle Place, with some concerts taking place at this venue.

A number of Irish and international performers have appeared at the festival, including Emma Kirkby, Rachel Podger, Barthold and Wieland Kuijken, James Bowman, Rachel Brown, the Irish Baroque Orchestra, and Bob van Asperen.
