= Edward Grant (headmaster) =

English classical scholar, Latin poet and headmaster

Edward Grant (or Graunt; 1540s–1601) was an English classical scholar, Latin poet, and headmaster of Westminster School. He was also the first biographer of Roger Ascham.

== Life ==
He was educated at Westminster, and matriculated as a sizar of St. John's College, Cambridge, 22 February 1564. where he completed his exercises for the degree of B. A. about 1567. In February 1572, he was granted the degree of B.A. at Oxford by virtue of his residence at Cambridge, and a month later proceeded M.A. in the same university after obtaining a dispensation which relieved him of the necessity of residence. Anthony Wood says that he was a member first of Christ Church, Oxford or Broadgates Hall, Oxford, and afterwards of Exeter College, Oxford (the university register does not mention his connection with any college). He was incorporated M.A. at Cambridge on 16 December 1573, proceeded B.D. at Cambridge in 1577, and D.D. in 1589, being incorporated B.D. at Oxford 19 May 1579. He was a preacher licensed by Cambridge University in 1580, and presented books to St. John's College, Cambridge, 29 April 1579.

Grant became head-master of Westminster School in 1572, after serving as assistant master for about two years previously. He retained that office for twenty years, and was succeeded by William Camden in February 1593. On 15 December 1587 he wrote a Latin letter to the queen begging to be released from teaching after seventeen years' service. The next vacant prebend at Westminster was granted him by letters patent 14 November 1575, and he became a prebendary or canon 27 May 1577. He was vicar of South Benfleet, Essex, from 12 December 1584 till the following year; became rector of Bintree and Foulsham, Norfolk, 20 November 1586; canon of Ely in 1589; rector of East Barnet 3 November 1591, and rector of Toppesfield, Essex, on the queen's presentation 22 April 1598. He was also sub-dean of Westminster Abbey, and dying 4 August 1601 was buried in the abbey. A son Edward, who died 2 January 1588, aged five, was previously buried there. Another son, Gabriel, graduated from Trinity College, Cambridge, B.A. 1597, M.A. 1600, and D.D. 1612, and became canon of Westminster in 1612.; a brother John became a fellow of Trinity.

== Works ==
Grant was the intimate friend of Roger Ascham. In 1576 he published a collection of Ascham's letters with an Oratio de Vita et Obitu Rogeri Aschami prefixed, and a dedication of the whole to the queen. He was also author of 'Tῆς Ἑλληνικής γλώσσης σταχυολογία', Graecae Linguae Spicilegium in Scholae Westmonasteriensis Progymnasmata divulgatum, London, 1575, dedicated to Lord Burghley. An epitome by Camden entitled Institutio Graecae Grammatices, London, 1597, passed through numerous editions. He also published an enlarged and corrected version of a Lexicon Graeco-Latinum Joannis Crispini . . . ex R. Constantini aliorumq. scriptis . . . collectum, London, 1581, dedicated to Robert Dudley, 1st Earl of Leicester.

Grant contributed verses in Greek, Latin, or English to Humphrey Lhuyd's Breviary of Britaine, translated by Thomas Twyne, 1573; John Prise's Historiae Brytannicae Defensio, 1573; Thomas Tymme's translation of the Civil Wars in France attributed to Petrus Ramus, 1573; John Baret's Alvearie; Gabriel Harvey's Gratulationum Valdinensium lib. ii. (on Leicester's arms); and John Stockwood's Disputatiunculum Grammaticalium Libellus. He also lamented Bishop John Jewel's and Ascham's deaths in Latin verse.
