= St Mary's Collegiate Church, Youghal =

Collegiate Church of Saint Mary the Virgin
- Eaglais Choláisteach Naomh Muire
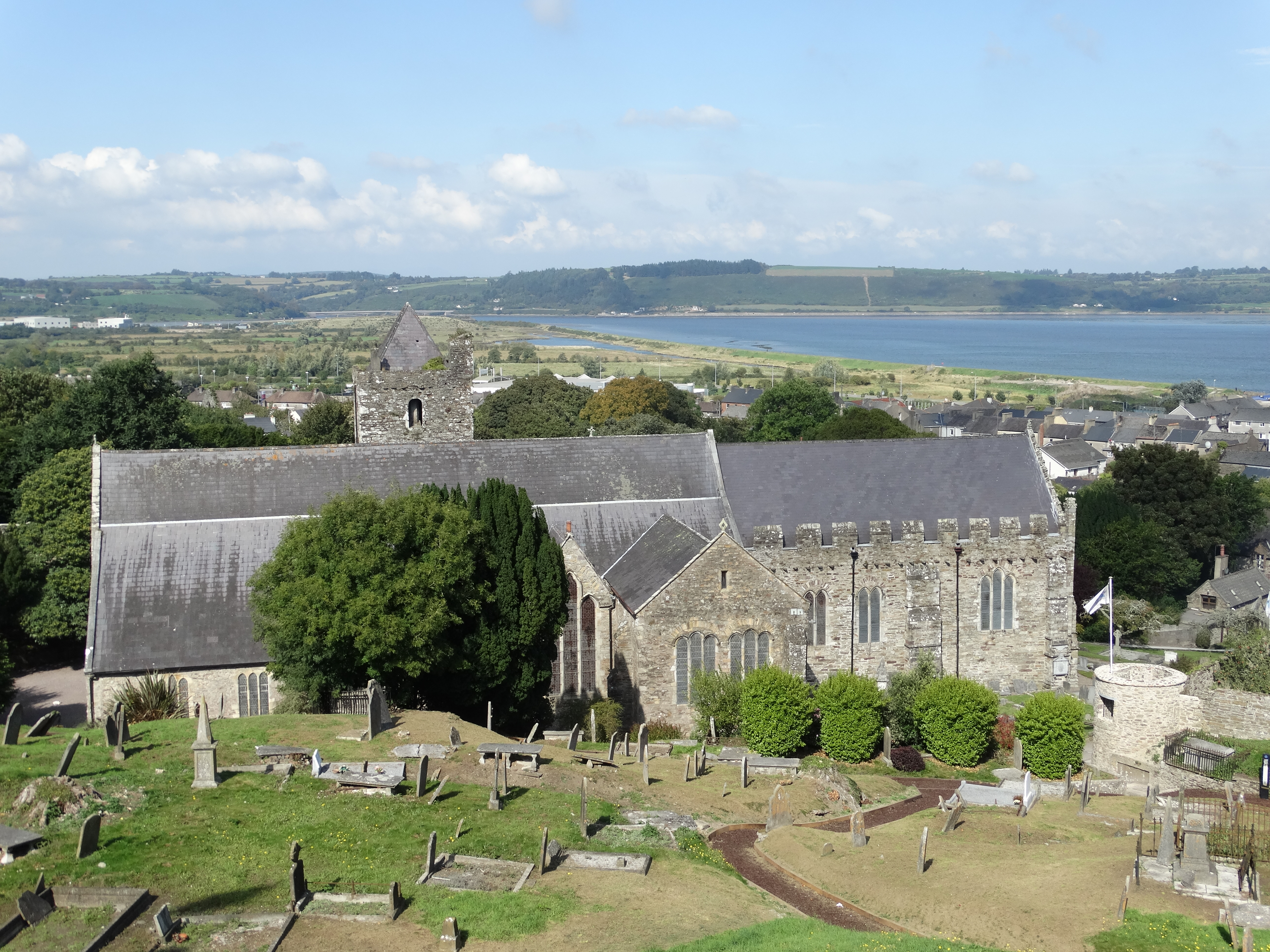
- St Mary's Collegiate Church, Youghal

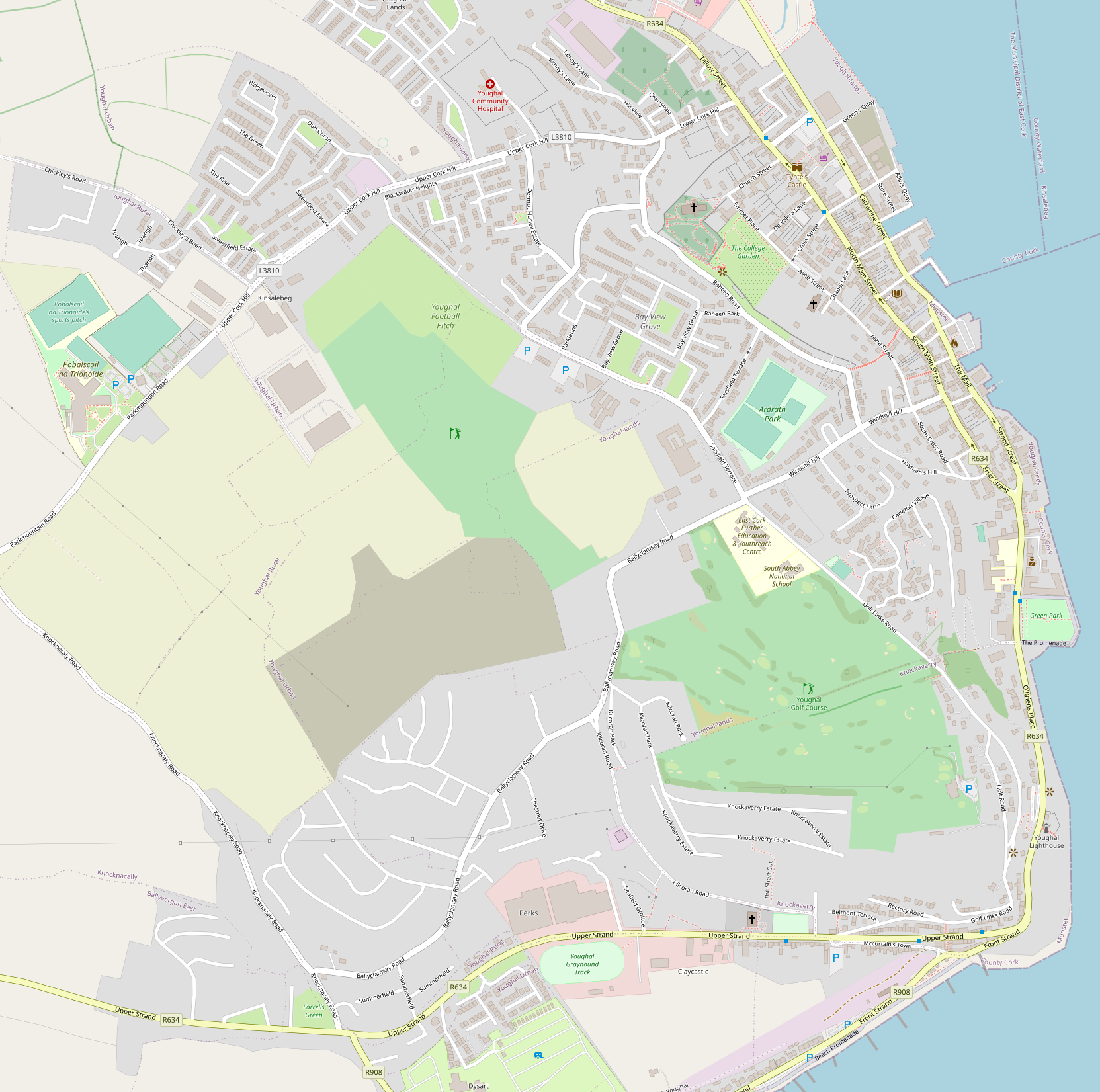
- Location within Youghal Location within Ireland
- 51.95503°N 7.85358°W
- Language: English
- Denomination: Church of Ireland
- Previous denomination: Roman Catholic
- Churchmanship: High Church
- Website: youghal.cork.anglican.org

History
- Dedication: Mary, mother of Jesus

Administration
- Province: Dublin
- Diocese: Cork, Cloyne and Ross
- Parish: Youghal

The Collegiate Church of Saint Mary the Virgin, also known as St Mary's Collegiate Church, is a large Anglican church in Youghal, east County Cork, Ireland. Dating to roughly 1220 and dedicated to the Virgin Mary, it is part of Youghal Union of Parishes, in the United Dioceses of Cork, Cloyne and Ross.

St Mary's RMP (Record of Monuments and Places) number is CO067-029003.

== History ==
The current church is built on the site of at least one and possibly two previous churches. The Collegiate Church is a building of great historical importance for Ireland. It is now a National Monument of Ireland. The Collegiate Church is under the care of the government, by way of a lease between the Church of Ireland Representative Church Body, and the Youghal Urban District Council.

=== Early history ===
According to local tradition, an early monastic church was founded by Declán of Ardmore in the mid 5th-century. It was supposedly rebuilt in Irish Romanesque style around 750.

The current form of the church dates to roughly the year 1220, and contains traces of an earlier, eleventh-century church that was damaged in 1192. The roof timbers have been carbon dated by Queen's University Belfast to the year 1170. There was an early-13th-century re-building and this was under the direction and hand of the Masters of four local guilds of operative masons, whose marks are still to be found on the pillars of the gothic arches.

The earliest entry in the vestry book of Youghal is a statement of parish accounts for 1201. Pope Nicholas IV, in the taxations of 1291, described Youghal as being the richest benefice in Cloyne. The list of clergy can be traced back to this date.

=== Formation of the Collegiate Church ===
On St John's Day (27 December) 1464 St Mary's was made a Collegiate Church, with the foundation of Our Lady's College of Yoghill by Thomas FitzGerald, 7th Earl of Desmond (proprietor of Youghal and Lord Deputy of Ireland), for the purpose of training seminarians. It was served by a Warden and Clerks consisting of eight Fellows and eight singing men.

=== Reformation ===
Following the Reformation, the church and its assets came into the control of the Established church. The majority Roman Catholic population was obliged to quit the church and to conduct their services elsewhere on private premises. Due to the Penal Laws, it was not possible to construct another church until 1796 when St Mary's parish church was built. That church remains the oldest Catholic church in the Roman Catholic Diocese of Cloyne still active as a parish church. The last Catholic warden was Thomas Allen (1533); Roger Skiddy was appointed by King Edward VI. He is described as "Warden of Youghal" in 1567. Sixty years later all the endowments were acquired by the Earl of Cork, and in 1639 the rectory was united to the wardenship. A Catholic succession of wardens was maintained as late as 1709, when Father Richard Harnet held the position, which by then was merely titular. In the Anglican succession, the Bishop of Cloyne was and is deemed to be the Warden.

In 1597, the college house was plundered and laid in ruins by the insurgent forces of Gerald FitzGerald, 15th Earl of Desmond, who, among other acts of desecration, unroofed the beautiful High Chancel.

=== 17th century ===
Sir Walter Raleigh was Mayor of Youghal in 1588 and lived in the Warden's Residence (now known as Myrtle Grove). Having bought Sir Walter's land for £1,000 in 1596, Richard Boyle, 1st Earl of Cork, bought the church on 29 March 1606. Two years later, at the cost of £2,000, he rebuilt the church making good the devastation of the Desmond Rebellion. He endeavoured at the same time to increase the population of the town by infusion of "an active and enterprising race of English inhabitants". In the civil war or 1641, Richard Boyle added two large towers to the house, built five circular turrets to around the park and cast a platform of earth on which he placed ordnance to command the town and harbour. He erected a marble monument for himself and his family which almost reaches the roof of the chapel. In 1649, during the Commonwealth, Oliver Cromwell conducted his campaign from Youghal and delivered a funeral oration from the top of a chest which is still preserved in the church.

=== 18th century – present ===
In 1782, the house passed to Nicholas Giles who converted it for use as a dwelling. It is this house that is seen today surrounded by just two of the original defence towers, the rest having been removed in 1782.

George Berkeley, Bishop of Cloyne and philosopher, took up residency as Warden of the College in 1734 and conducted services in the church. John Wesley, also visited Youghal in 1765 and attended Divine Service in St Mary's. Large-scale works of restoration, including the re-edification of the chancel, were carried out between 1851 and 1854. In 1833, £200 was given to the parish for slating the church roof and the present roof was accordingly put in. A restoration of a remedial nature was carried out between 1970 and 1973. In the late 1980s a chapel in the north transept, using the furnishing of the closed church of Templemichael, was created. This is not a 'Lady Chapel' as the church itself is dedicated to Our Lady, Saint Mary the Virgin.

=== Burials ===
Burials in the church's graveyard include Richard Boyle, 1st Earl of Cork, who died 1643.

== Architecture ==
Alongside Cloyne Cathedral and Saint Multose Church, Kinsale, the Collegiate Church of St Mary is one of the three largest surviving 13th-century Gothic churches in Cork.

The west window of the nave of St Mary's is an example of Early English Gothic architecture. The church is cruciform in shape.

== Notable clergy members ==
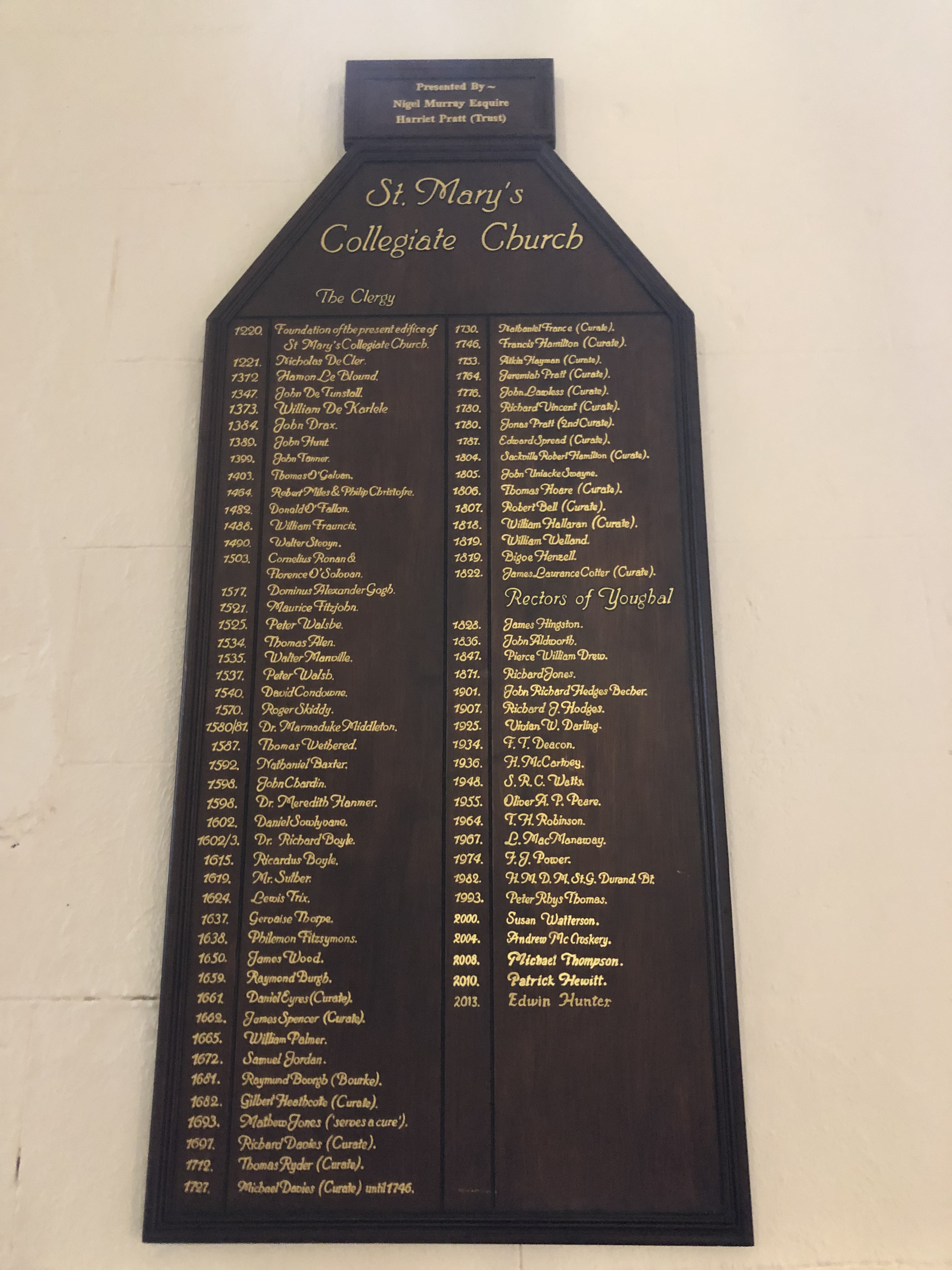
A list of all past clergy members of the parish, which hangs on a wall in St Mary's. The name of Andrew Orr, who was made rector in 2018, is absent.

- 1221 Nicholas De Cler, the first curate of St Mary's
- 1373 William De Karlele, a judge who became Archdeacon of Meath and sat in the Irish House of Commons
- 1570 Roger Skiddy
- 1580/81 Dr Marmaduke Middleton
- 1592 Nathaniel Baxter
- 1598 Dr Meredith Hanmer
- 1602/3 Dr Richard Boyle

== Music ==
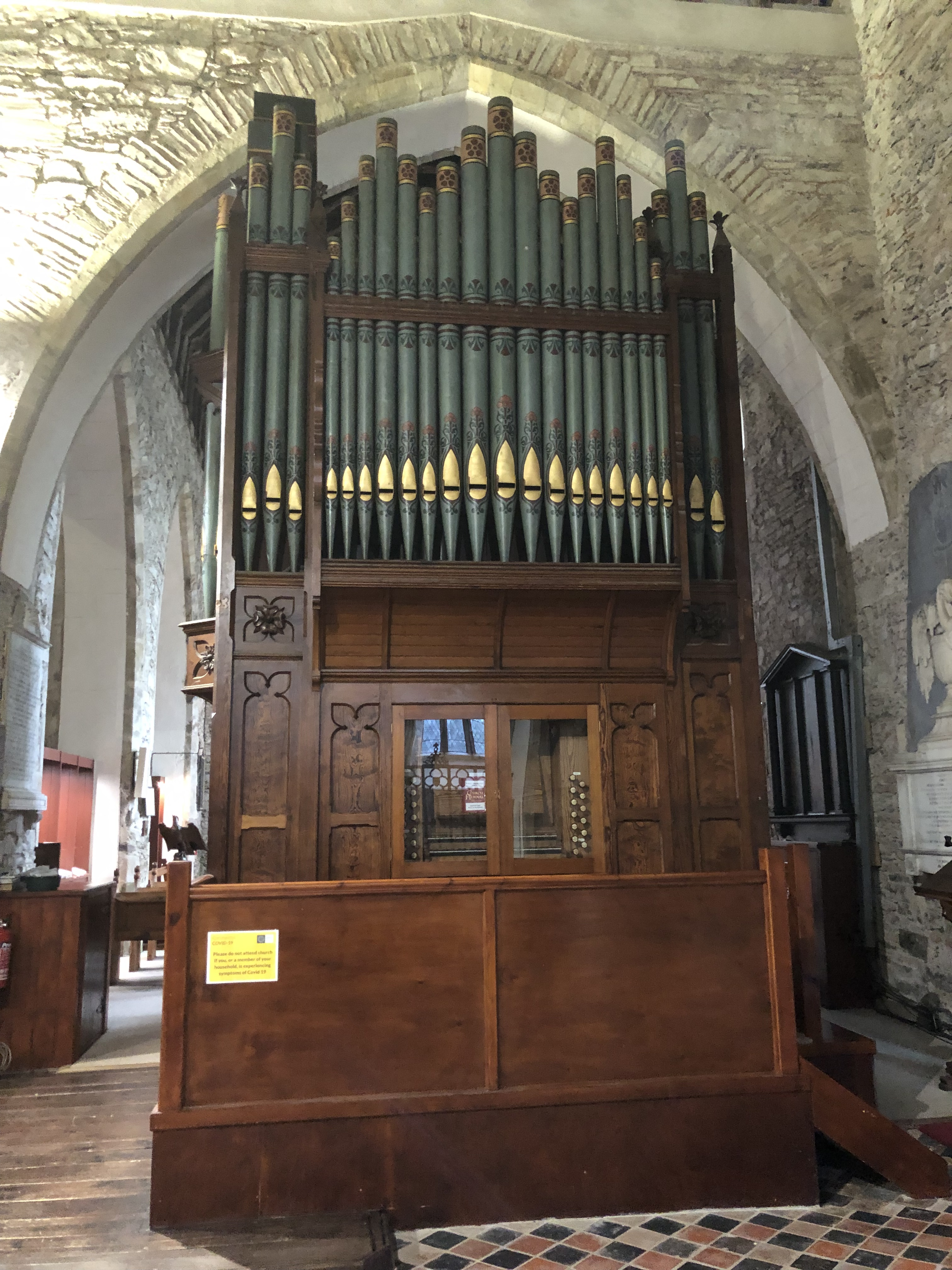
The organ from 2007, photographed in 2021.

There has been a long history of music in the church. From 2005, music was provided by "The Clerks Choral", which sang traditional Anglican repertoire throughout the Irish academic year. The then Organist and Master of the Clerks Choral was Ian Sexton. The Clerks continue, but sing more often now in Cloyne Cathedral and other venues. The Collegiate Church is still used for recitals, concerts and festivals, including for some concerts in the East Cork Early Music Festival. Due to a decision in the 1970s to remove the lime plaster from the rubble walls, the acoustics of the building are less than ideal for choral music. It is, however, a good venue for instrumental music as well as folk, etc.

=== Organ ===
In 1812 an organ was purchased and a gallery erected for it at the western end of the nave. In 1861 a new organ was procured at a cost of £300 from Telford and Telford Organs Builders of Dublin. The organ was removed in 1965 as it was in a very poor condition and the ongoing costs seemed impossible at the time.

In 2007 a much larger instrument was procured for the price of £1, although it cost nearly £1,000 to move it. It was moved from the deconsecrated church of St Michael on the Mount Without in Bristol, England, by an Irish firm of organ builders who then restored it. It was installed in the north bay of the crossing of the Great Nave.

== Photo gallery ==
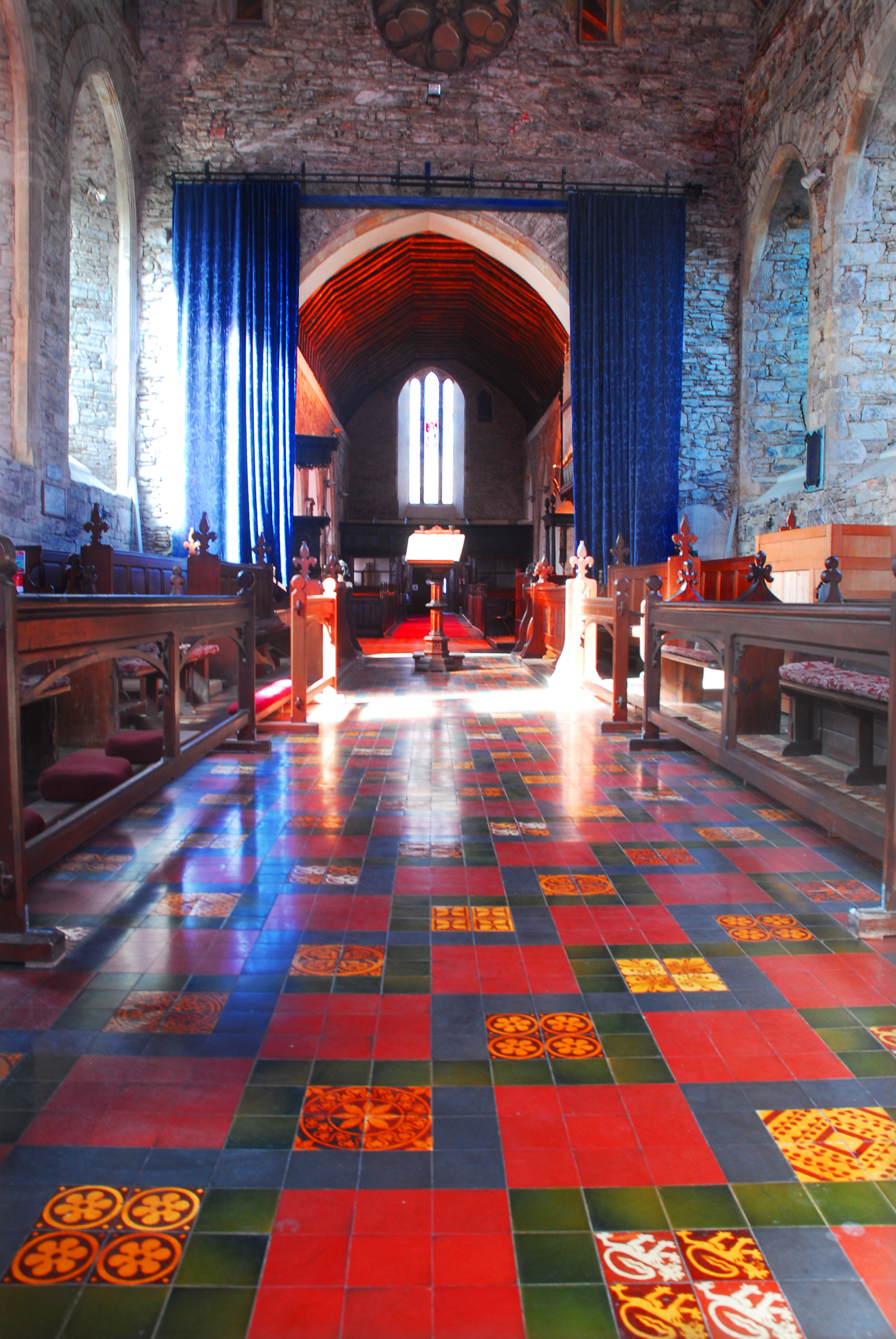
Inside St Mary's Collegiate Church, Youghal

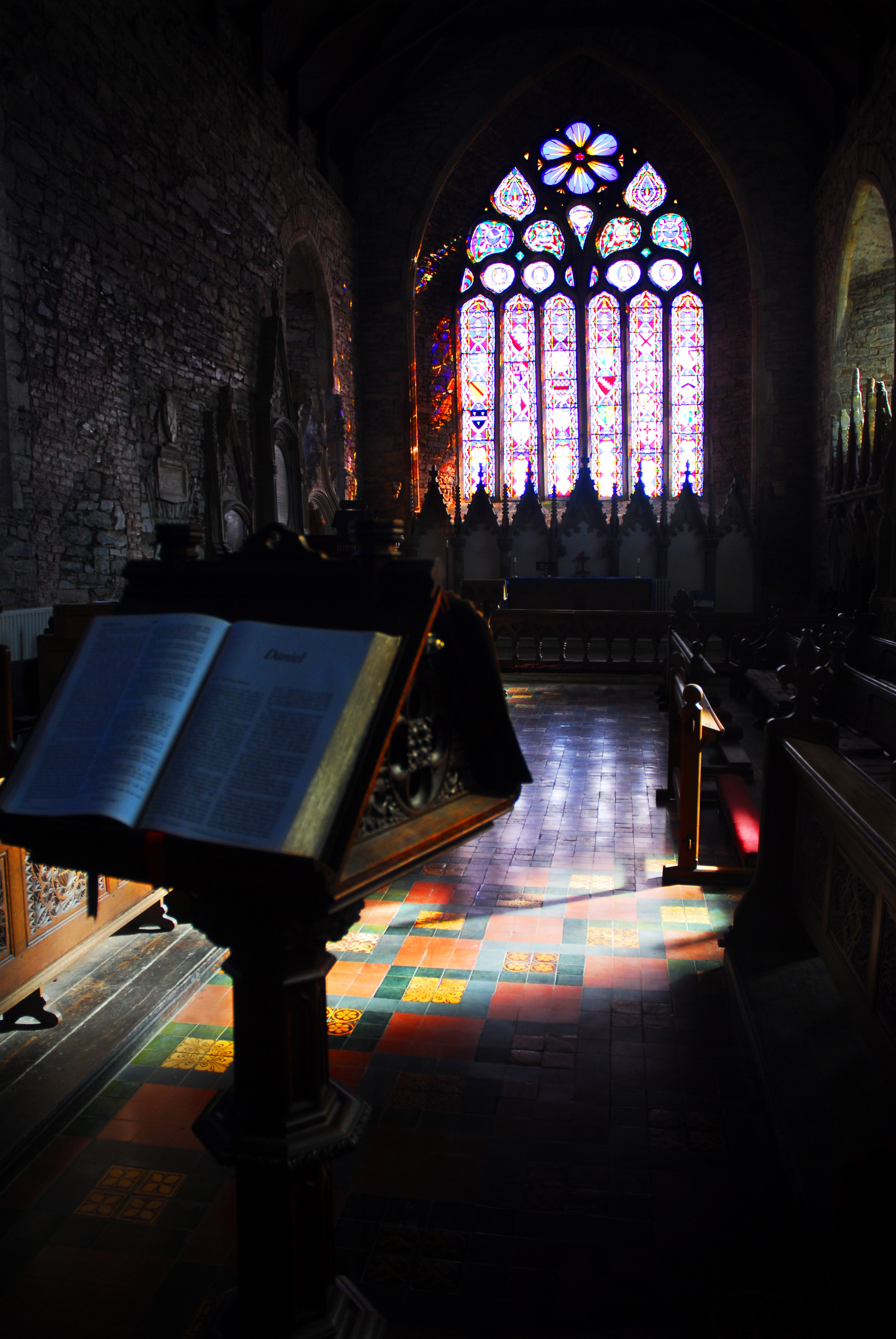
Inside St Mary's Collegiate Church

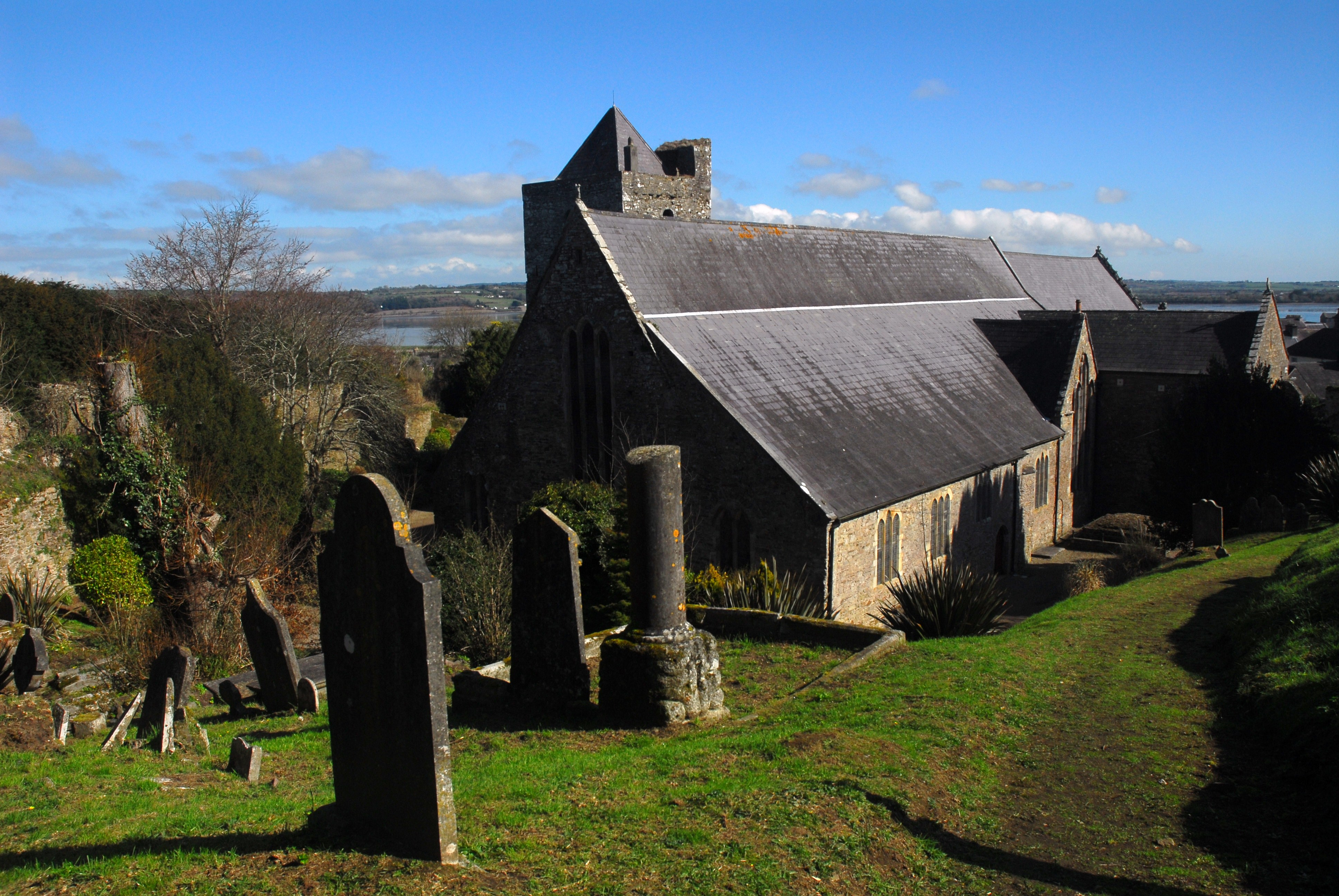
Rear of St Mary's Collegiate Church

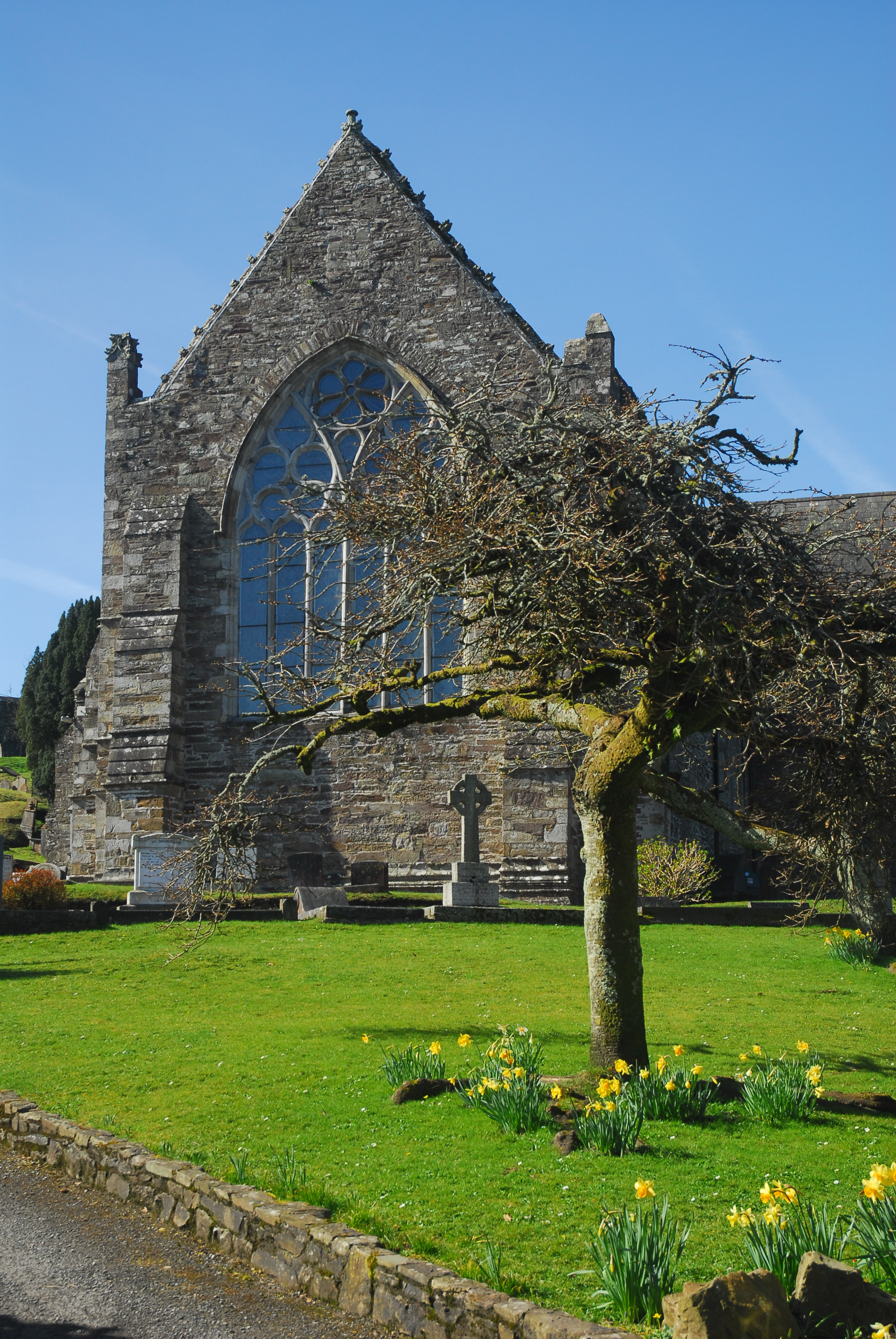
Front St Mary's Collegiate Church

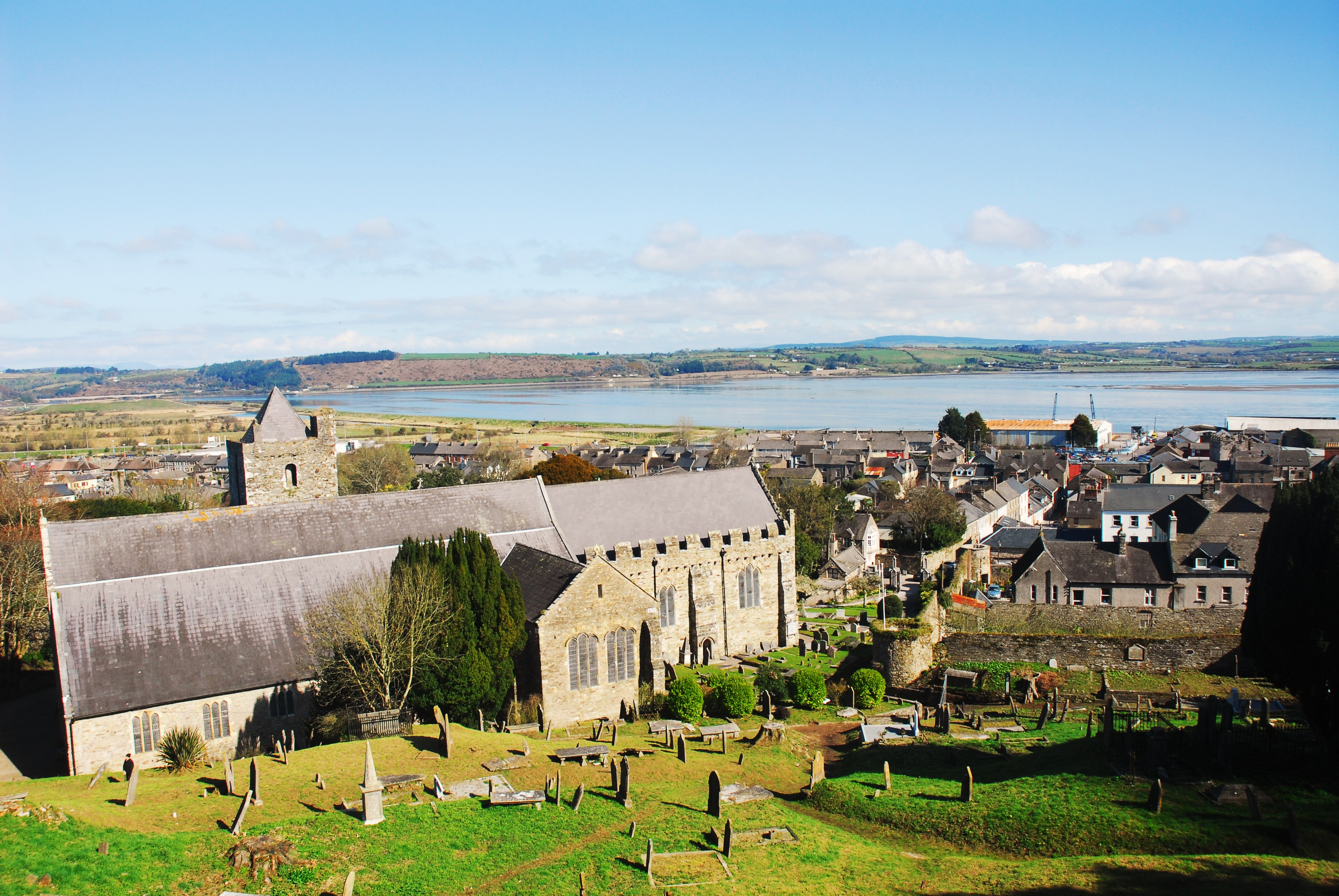
St Mary's Collegiate
