= Thomas Tymme =

English clergyman, translator and author

Thomas Tymme (or Timme) (died 1620) was an English clergyman, translator and author. He combined Puritan views, including the need for capital punishment for adultery, with a positive outlook on alchemy and experimental science.

== Life ==
He seems to have been educated at Cambridge, possibly at Pembroke Hall, under Edmund Grindal. On 22 October 1566 he was presented to the rectory of St. Antholin, Budge Row, London, and in 1575 he became rector of Hasketon, near Woodbridge, Suffolk. He appears to have held the rectory of St. Antholin until 12 October 1592, when Nicholas Felton was appointed his successor.

He secured patronage in high quarters, among those to whom his books were dedicated being Thomas Radclyffe, 3rd Earl of Sussex, Charles Blount, Earl of Devonshire, Ambrose Dudley, 3rd Earl of Warwick, Archbishop Grindal, Sir Edward Coke and Sir John Puckering. He died at Hasketon in April 1620, being buried there on the 29th.

Tymme married, at Hasketon, on 17 July 1615, Mary Hendy, who died in 1657, leaving one son, Thomas Tymme. William Tymme, possibly a brother of Thomas, printed many books between 1601 and 1615.

== Works ==
In 1570 he published his first work, a translation from the Latin of John Brentius, entitled Newes from Niniue to Englande (London). It was followed in 1574 by the translation of Pierre de La Place supposed history of the civil wars in France, entitled 'The Three Partes of Commentaries containing the whole and perfect Discourse of the Civill Warres of France under the Raignes of Henry the Second, Frances the Second, and of Charles the Ninth' (London, 4to); prefixed is a long copy of verses in Tymme's praise by Edward Grant.

Tymme produced numerous translations, chiefly of theological works. He published:

- A Catholike and Ecclesiasticall Exposition of the Holy Gospell after S. John . . . gathered by A. Marlorat, and translated by T. Tymme, London, 1575. From Augustin Marlorat.
- A Commentarie upon S. Paules Epistles to the Corinthians, written by John Caluin, and translated out of the Latin, London, 1577.
- A Commentarie of John Caluin upon Genesis . . . translated out of the Latin, London, 1578.
- A Catholike and Ecclesiasticall Exposition of the Holy Gospel after S. Mark and Luke, gathered ... by Augustine Marlorat, and translated out of Latin, London, 1583.
- The Figure of Antichriste ... disciphered by a Catholike ... Exposition of the Second Epistle to the Thessalonians, London, 1586.
- A Discoverie of Ten English Lepers [i.e. the Schismatic, Murderer, &c.] ... setting before our Eies the Iniquitie of these Latter Daies, London, 1592.
- A Briefe Description of Hierusalem ... translated out of the Latin [of S. Adrichomius], London, 1595; other editions, 1654, and 1666.
- The Poore Mans Paternoster ... newly imprinted, London, 1598.
- The Practice of Chymicall and Hermeticall Physicke ... written in Latin by Josephus Quersitanus, and translated ..., London, 1605. A translation of two Latin alchemical works by Josephus Quercetanus or Joseph Duchesne. According to Allen Debus, Tymme involved alchemical thinking in his theology, in particular of the Creation and Last Judgement.
- A Dialogue Philosophicall . . . together with the Wittie Invention of an Artificiall Perpetual Motion, London, 1612. Discusses the perpetual motion machine of Cornelius Drebbel.
- A Siluer Watchbell, 10th impression, 1614; a work of devotion, it reached a nineteenth edition in 1659.
- The Chariot of Devotion ..., London, 1618.

Tymme also made a new edition of A Looking-Glasse for the Court (1575), translated by Sir Francis Bryan in 1548 from an original by Antonio de Guevara.
