= Jacobus Verheiden =

Dutch schoolmaster

Jacobus Verheiden (Verheidanus Graviensis) (fl. 1590–1618) was a Dutch schoolmaster known as an author.

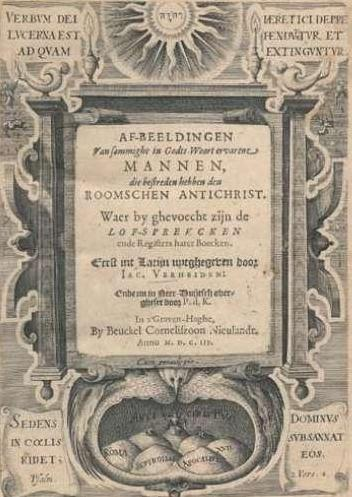
Title page from Af-beeldingen van sommighe in Godts-Woort ervarene mannen (1603), the Dutch translation of Praestantium aliquot theologorum (1602) by Verheiden.

== Life ==
He was the elder brother of William Verheiden (1568–1596) from Grave. They both attended the University of Leiden in 1590, and Jacobus was at Heidelberg in 1591. He became rector of the Latin school in Nijmegen. He was a friend of Thomas Bodley.

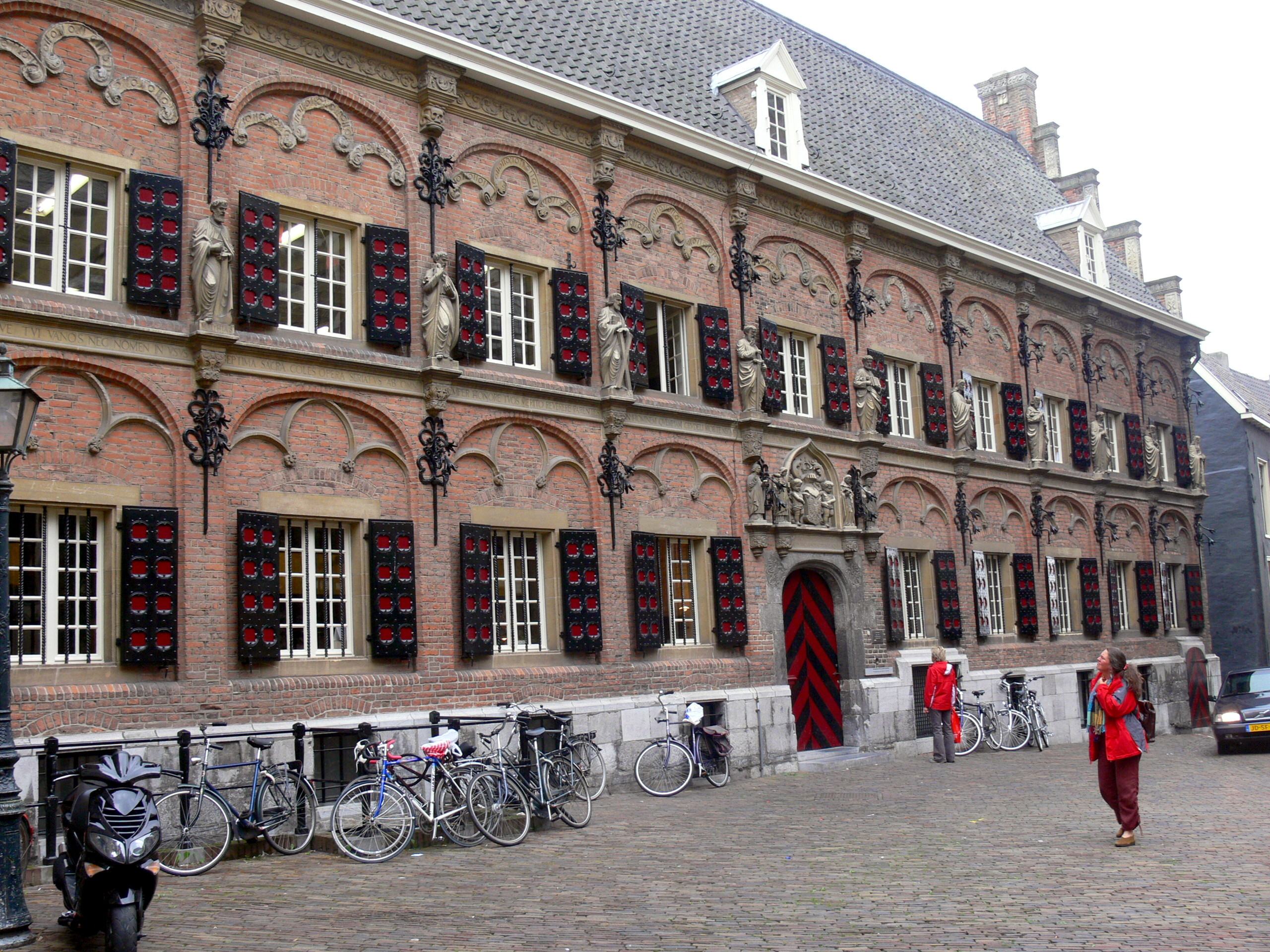
The Latin school in Nijmegen, building dating from 1544.

Verheiden was a delegate from the Synod of Gelderland to the Synod of Dort in 1618.

== Works ==
The Praestantium aliquot theologorum (1602) consisted of 50 engraved portraits of Protestant theologians, with a few earlier figures (Berengar of Tours, John Wycliffe, Jan Hus, Jerome of Prague, Girolamo Savonarola and Erasmus) and a few laymen, for which Verheiden supplied Latin text, including biographical and bibliographical information. Many of the images, by Hendrik Hondius I, had appeared in an earlier work. The full title presents these men as opponents of the Roman Antichrist, combining images with eulogies by Verheiden; the work is also known by the short Imagines et elogia. The Dutch translation of 1603, as Afbeeldingen van sommighe in Godts Woort ervarene Mannen, was by Pauwels de Kempenare. A second edition appeared in 1725, edited by Friedrich Roth-Scholtz.

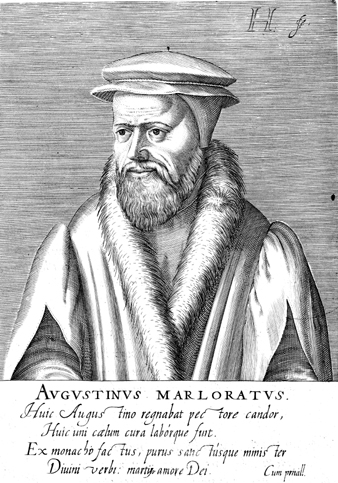
Augustin Marlorat, engraving by Henrik Hondius the Elder from Praestantium aliquot theologorum (1602).

The Praestantium was used at the University of Oxford, and some of the images influenced the painted frieze of the Bodleian Library. An English adaptation appeared as The History of the Moderne Protestant Divines (1637) by Donald Lupton; it included also material from the Heroologia Anglica of Henry Holland.

His first work was De jure belli belgici adversus Philippum (1596). He wrote also a biography of his brother, Vita Guillelmi Verheiden Belgae (1598).
