= Nathaniel Baxter =

English clergyman and poet

Nathaniel Baxter (fl. 1569–1606) was an English clergyman and poet. In earlier life tutor to Sir Philip Sidney, and interested in the manner of Sidney's circle in literature and Ramist logic, he became more sternly religious in his opinions. He is now remembered for his 1606 poem Ourania, though not for its poetic merit.

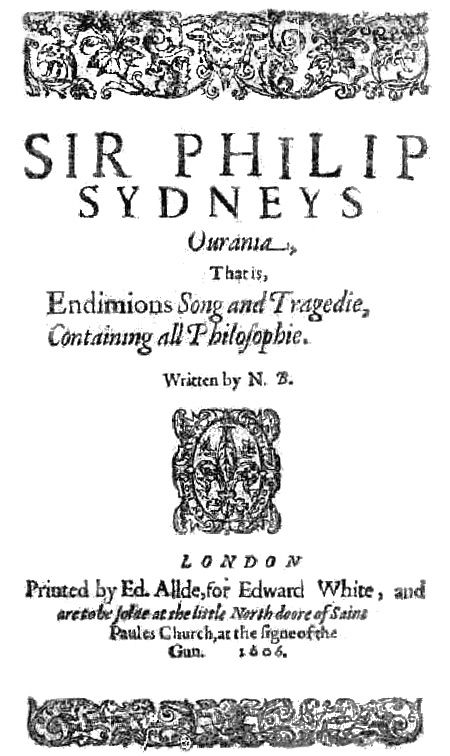
Title page of Baxter’s Ourania (1606).

== Life ==
He was tutor in Greek to Sir Philip Sidney, and was a student of Magdalen College, Oxford in 1569, graduating M.A. in 1577. He had been one of the travelling companions of Edward de Vere, 17th Earl of Oxford in Europe in 1575–7. He makes allusions to de Vere in Ourania, while addressing his daughter Susan who married Philip Herbert, 4th Earl of Pembroke. He held clerical positions successively at Redbourn in Hertfordshire, Finedon and Titchmarsh in Northamptonshire, Leire in Leicestershire, at St. Margaret Lothbury and St. Giles-in-the-Fields in London (1590). Baxter was one of the signatories to the famous letter addressed to Thomas Cartwright, dated London, 25 May 1577.

He became warden of Collegiate Church of St Mary Youghal, Ireland, in 1592, and was inducted into the office of warden 23 May 1592 by William Lyon. On 25 August 1597 Baxter found that the revenues of the college were threatened. He was obliged to give a bond that he would, within forty days after demand, resign his office. On 26 April 1598 complaint was made to the court of revenue exchequer, that Baxter had refused to allow the officer of the court to sequestrate the revenues of the college. An attachment was issued against him, and a new sequestration issued. On 30 June 1598 Baxter, having resisted the surrender of his office, through third parties disposed of the college revenues and the college house to Sir Thomas Norris, President of Munster. Baxter then resigned; but the commissioners, finding that the revenues had been disposed of, refused to accept the trust. Baxter left Ireland in 1599.

He is next found vicar of Mitchel Troy, Monmouthshire, and compounding for his first-fruits of the living 26 May 1602. In 1633 he was engaged in controversy with John Downes, a theologian of Bristol.

== Works ==
Joseph Hunter, in his New Illustrations of Shakespeare (1845), took Baxter to be the author of Ourania, a work previously ascribed to Nicholas Breton. Ourania describes its author's tutorial relation to Sir Philip Sidney, and there are various details of the poet's history and of his house in Troy. The name 'Tergaster' reveals the playful nickname given by Sidney to his tutor; Tergaster is dog-Latin for Back- or Bax-ter. There are flattering addresses in verse to contemporary 'fair ladies and brave men'.

Religious works included:

- A Soneraigne Salue for a Sinful Soule, comprising a Necessarie and True Meanes whereby a sinful conscience may be unburdened and reconciled to God; wherein you shall find all the Epithetons or Titles of the Son of God which for the most part are found in Scripture.
- Calvin's Lectures or Daily Sermons upon the Prophet Jonas, translated into English by Nathaniel Baxter, with a complaint in verse and a long dedication to Sir John Brocket (1578), another edition being dedicated to Sir Francis Walsingham, 22 January 1577.
- A Catholique and Ecclesiastical position of the last Epistle of John, collected out of the Works of the best Writers by Augustine Marlorat, dedicated to Lady Walsingham (1578).

D. Nathaniaelis Baxteri Colcestrensis queastiones et responsa in Petri Ranii [i.e. Rami] dialecticam, London, 1586, was a work on logic.
