= Nicolas des Gallars =

Calvinist pastor and theologian (died 1581)

Nicolas des Gallars [in Lat. Gallasius] (c. 1520 - 1581), was a Calvinist pastor and theologian.

== Life ==
Gallars was of noble birth, and "possessed legal training, rich exposure to the humanities, and polished Latin." He first appears as author of a Defensio of William Farel, published at Geneva in 1545, followed (1545–1549) by translations into French of three tracts by John Calvin. Scott Manetsch notes that Gallars' appointment "signaled an important new stage in Calvin's recruitment efforts." In 1551 Gallars was admitted bourgeois of Geneva, and in 1553 made pastor of the church in Jussy.

In 1557 Gallars was sent to minister to the Protestants at Paris; his conductor, Nicolas du Rousseau, having prohibited books in his possession, was executed at Dijon; des Gallars, having nothing suspicious about him, continued his journey.

On the revival of the Strangers' church in London (1560), he, being then minister at Geneva, came to London to organize the French branch; and in 1561 he published La Forme de police ecclesiastique instituée a Londres en l'Eglise des Français. In the same year he assisted Theodore Beza at the colloquy of Poissy. He became minister to the Protestants at Orléans in 1564; presided at the synod of Paris in 1565; was driven out of Orléans with other Protestants in 1568; and in 1571 was chaplain to Jeanne d'Albret, queen of Navarre.

== Works ==
Calvin held him in high esteem, employing him as amanuensis, and as editor as well as translator of several of his exegetical and polemical works. He himself wrote a commentary on Exodus (1560); edited an annotated French Bible (1562) and New Testament (1562); and published tracts against Arians (1565–1566).

His main work was his edition of Irenaeus (1570) with prefatory letter to Grindal, then bishop of London, and giving, for the first time, some fragments of the Greek text.
