= Colloquy of Poissy =

1561 conference between Catholics and Protestants (Huguenots) in France

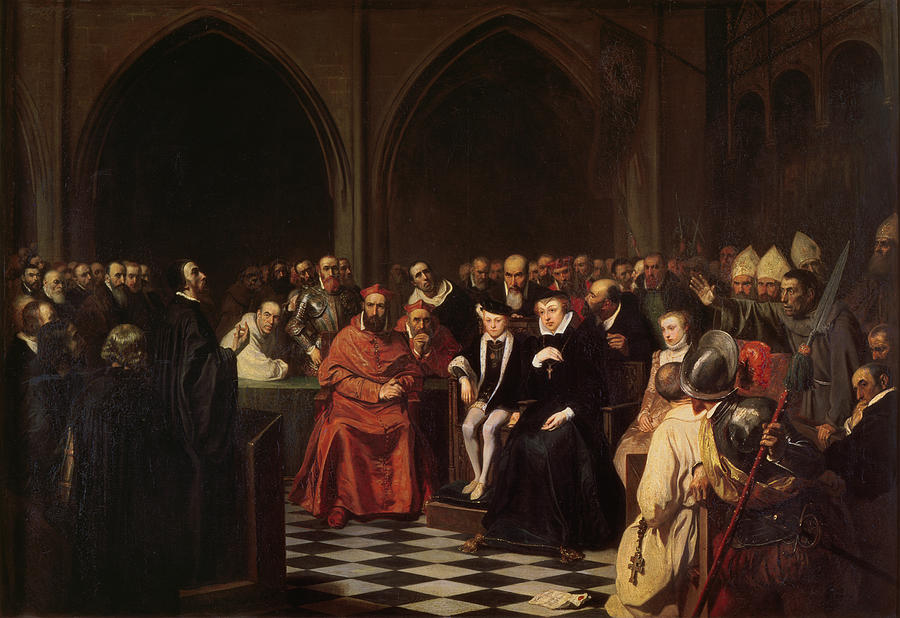
Painting by Joseph Nicolas Robert-Fleury

The Colloquy at Poissy was a religious conference which took place in Poissy, France, in 1561. Its object was to effect a reconciliation between the Catholics and Protestants (Huguenots) of France.

The conference was opened on 9 September in the refectory of the convent of Poissy, King Charles IX (aged 11) himself being present. It broke up inconclusively a month later, on 9 October, by which point the divide between the doctrines appeared irreconcilable.

== Background ==
King Charles IX (1561)

The Calvinist faction in France was strong and vocal, under the guidance of several princes of the royal blood and members of the higher nobility. The spread of Protestantism, and the application of its fundamental principle of private judgement, produced far-reaching differences in belief. To heal those, and so bring about unity, a conference on free will was held at Weimar in 1560, involving Lutherans Viktor Striegel (1524–69) and Matthias Flacius.

The Poissy conference was arranged by Catherine de' Medici, the Florentine Catholic queen-mother and regent during the minority of her son, Charles IX of France, with the support of the Chancellor Michel de l'Hôpital and the lieutenant-general of the kingdom, Anthony of Navarre. The heads of the Catholic party had attempted to frustrate any form of negotiation.

Disaffection towards the Holy See had paralysed French Catholic activity. The Council of Trent, a general council, was in session under the presidency of Pope Pius IV, but voices were heard, even among the French bishops, advocating the convocation of a separate national synod. Instead, Catherine and her advisers chose a religious conference under the direction of the civil power. The Pope tried to prevent what, under the circumstances, had to be construed by Catholics as the defiance of his ecclesiastical authority.

== Attendance ==
The Pope sent as papal legate Ippolito d'Este, known as the Cardinal of Ferrara, with Diego Laynez, the second General superior of the Jesuits, as his adviser, to dissuade the regent and the bishops. But the affair had gone too far. At the conference, six French Cardinals and thirty-eight archbishops and bishops, with a host of minor prelates and doctors, spent a month in discussions with the Calvinists. Theodore Beza from Geneva and Peter Martyr Vermigli from Zürich appeared at the colloquy; the German theologians to whom invitations had been despatched only arrived in Paris after the discussion was broken off. Beza was assisted by Nicolas des Gallars, who wrote a report of the conference, for Edmund Grindal, then bishop of London where de Gallars currently had a church.

== Proceedings ==
On 9 September the representatives of the rival denominations began their pleadings. The proceedings were opened by a speech of Chancellor L'Hôpital, who emphasized the right and duty of the monarch to provide for the needs of the Church. Even should a general council be in session, a colloquy between Frenchmen convened by the king was the better way of settling religious disputes; for a general council, being mostly composed of foreigners, was deemed incapable of understanding the wishes and the needs of France.

The spokesman of the Reformed Church was Beza, who, in the first session, gave a lengthy exposition of its tenets. Beza's speech explained the principles of the Reformed understanding of the Eucharist; it was later revised, amended, and published in France. He excited such repugnance by his pronouncements on the Communion that he was interrupted by Cardinal François de Tournon.

Charles, Cardinal of Lorraine replied in the second session (16 September). On the motion, however, of Ippolito d'Este, the legate, exception was taken to the further conduct of the negotiations in full conclave; and a committee of twenty-four representatives, twelve from each party, was appointed ostensibly to facilitate a satisfactory decision. On the Catholic side there existed little wish for conciliation.

The Jesuit Laynez then claimed that the divinely appointed judge of the religious controversies was the Pope, not the Court of France. The acrimony with which he opposed the Protestants at least clarified the situation.

Catherine appointed a smaller committee of five Calvinists and five Catholics. Representing the Calvinists were Beza, Vermigli, Gallars, Marlorat and Delespine. Representing the Catholics were the Protestant Bishop of Valence and Archbishop of Sens alongside the Abbot of Salignac, Boutellier, and Claude D'Espence. Their task was to devise a formula on which the two churches might unite with regard to the question of the Eucharist. The Cardinal of Lorraine had asked whether the Calvinists were prepared to sign the Confession of Augsburg, a matter of dissension between them and the Lutheran Protestants. The committee drafted a vague formula which could be interpreted in a Catholic or a Calvinistic sense, and was consequently condemned by both parties. The assemblage of prelates refused assent, and the Calvinists would not commit themselves to the Lutheran Confession.

=== Further conferences ===
Subsequently, there were meetings at Altenburg (20 October 1568 – 9 March 1569) between the Jena theologians and those from Wittenberg, on free will and justification; and at Montbéliard (1586) between Beza and the Tübingen theologians, on predestination. The Catholic Church continued the Council of Trent until 1563, and issued its own statements on the Eucharist and many other points of contention raised by various Protestant churches.

== Bibliography ==
- Nugent, Donald (1974). Ecumenism in the Age of the Reformation: The Colloquy of Poissy. Cambridge MA: Harvard University Press. p. 74. ISBN 978-0-674-23725-4.
- Di Bondeno, Agostino (2018). Colloqui di Poissy. Rome: Albatros. ISBN 978-8-85679319-2.
- Ruble, Alphonse baron de (1889). Le colloque de Poissy (septembre-octobre 1561) (in French). Paris: H. Champion.
- Sutherland, N. M. (1984). "7. The Cardinal of Lorraine and the Colloque of Poissy, 1561: A Reassessment". Princes, Politics and Religion, 1547–1589. London: Hambledon Press. pp. 113–138. ISBN 978-0-8264-6401-9.
