= Augustin Marlorat =

French Protestant reformer

Augustin Marlorat du Pasquier (Augustinus Marloratus) (1506 - 31 October 1562) was a French Protestant reformer, executed on a treason charge.

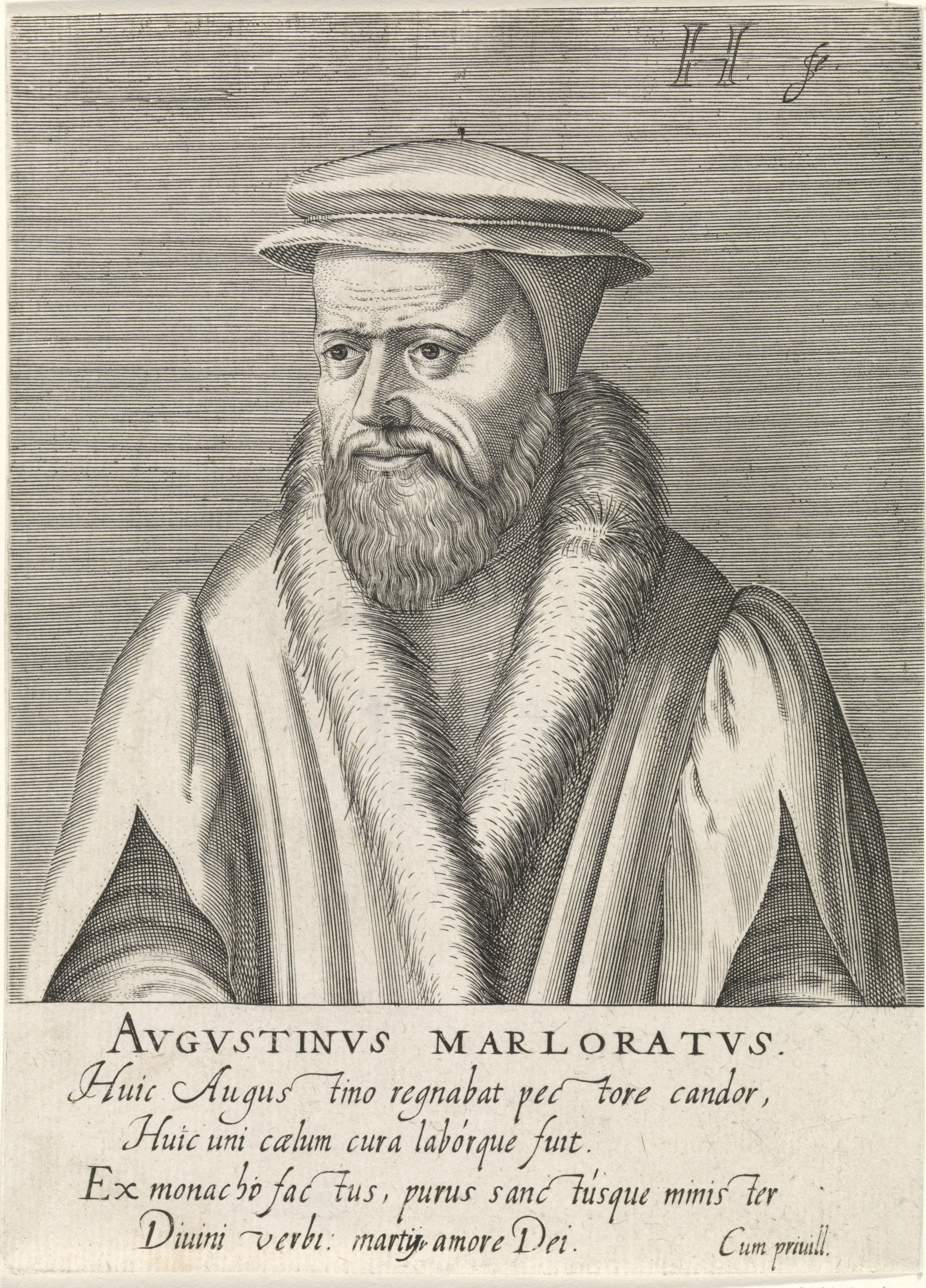
Augustin Marlorat, engraving by Henrik Hondius the Elder from a 1602 work by Jacob Verheiden.

== Life ==
He was born at Bar-le-Duc about 1506. At the age of eight he was placed in an Augustinian monastery, where he took the vows and was ordained priest in 1524. Nine years later he was abbot of a monastery at Bourges, but, becoming indoctrinated with the principles of Protestantism, he left France in 1535 and took refuge in Geneva, where he worked as a proof-reader for Greek and Hebrew.

At the recommendation of Pierre Viret he was appointed to a pastorate in Grissier near Lausanne, and there married. From Grissier he was called to Vevey, where he remained until 1559. The dismissal of Viret in the controversy on excommunication, however, led Marlorat, who approved the rigidly Calvinistic procedure, to resign, and after a brief time in Geneva he was sent in July to Paris as pastor of the Evangelical congregation there. After a year he accepted a call to Rouen as first preacher, where Protestants were still struggling to secure the right to hold public services. On the accession of Charles IX of France in December 1560, they addressed a petition, written by Marlorat, to the parliament and the king, requesting permission to use a church. The petition was refused, but the Protestants of Rouen felt themselves able to defy the edict of 25 July 1561, and hold their services in the halls of the ancient tower.

Marlorat likewise addressed a printed petition to Catharine de' Medici, in which he asserted the loyalty of the Protestants, and in August of the same year he was summoned to the Colloquy at Poissy. In debates there with the doctors of the Sorbonne, in January 1562, on images and baptism, he was one of the three spokesmen of the Protestants.

Returning to Rouen, Marlorat presided over the provincial synod held on 25 January 1562. After the massacre at Vassy on 1 March 1562, the Protestants of Rouen planned to seize their city. On the night of 15 April they carried out their purpose, and Marlorat was appointed one of the three heads of the new government, which still professed to be loyal to the king. Rouen was speedily fortified, and on 27 May the city was invested by an army under the command of the Duc d'Aumale, who, however, was forced to retire on 12 June. On 29 September a second force led by Charles himself, Anthony of Navarre, and others appeared before the city. Rouen was gradually reduced, but Montgomery, who commanded the besieged, like Marlorat, would accept no terms which did not include free exercise of the Protestant religion, and on 26 October the city was carried by storm. Marlorat and his family were captured and imprisoned. Three days later he was tried before the parliament on a charge of high treason, and on 30 October was condemned to be executed in front of the church in which he had preached. The sentence was carried out on the following day.

== Works ==
The chief works of Marlorat were:

- Novi Testamenti catholica expositio ecclesiastica (Geneva, 1561);
- similar commentaries on Genesis (1561), the Psalms, and the Song of Solomon (1562);
- posthumous commentaries on Isaiah (1564) and Job (1585);
- a concordance, Thesaurus in locos communes rerum dogmatum ... et phraseon ... ordine alphabetico digestus (ed. W. Fenguereius, London, 1574).

Robert Estienne had proposed to publish new Biblical commentaries by Marlorat. English translations were made of his commentary on Mark and Luke by Thomas Tymme (London, 1583), on John by the same (1575), on II and III John by Nathaniel Baxter (1578?), and on Revelation by Arthur Golding (1574). Marlorat also prepared the index to the Institutio of John Calvin, which later formed an integral portion of the work.
