= Rachel Brown (flautist) =

British flautist and writer

Rachel Brown is a British flautist and author, known especially for her work with Baroque music and flutes. She is currently professor of baroque flute at the Royal College of Music in London, in addition to travelling around the world to give master classes. She has performed with many orchestras internationally, including as principal flute with Kent Opera, the Academy of Ancient Music, the Hanover Band, the King's Consort, Collegium Musicum 90, Ex Cathedra, and the Brandenburg Consort. She is known for her extensive work and mastery of both historical and modern flutes.

== Biography ==
Brown was born and raised in London. As a child, she studied recorder, flute at age 11 and piano. She was accepted into the Royal College of Music Junior College, where she took private lessons in each of these three instruments and played in a recorder consort. At age 15, Brown attended the Trevor Wye Summer School which motivated her to further her flute study and she later attended the Royal Northern College of Music (RNCM) to study with Wye. It was here that her interest in baroque flute grew. She also studied baroque flute with Lisa Beznosiuk during her years at RNCM. After graduation, she obtained positions with the Academy of Ancient Music and Kent Opera. In 1984, Brown travelled to the US to compete in the National Flute Association's Young Artist Competition, where she won first place. She credits this competition as helping her find international connections and becoming more connected to the flute community.

In 2003, she authored and published a book entitled The Early Flute: A Practical Guide about Baroque flute performance practices and techniques. This book has been called "invaluable resource for any flautist interested in historically informed performance".

She is active in teaching, holding positions at the Royal College, running a children's group called "Hummingbirds" for youngsters, and travelling internationally for master classes in the US, Canada, Sweden, Poland, Spain, the Netherlands, Belgium and New Zealand. Her scholarly work includes an extensive discography of Baroque pieces and a project on reviving over 300 Johann Joachim Quantz sonatas and concertos for publishing found during a research project at the Berlin State Library. She has revived the 18th-century practice of financing a project by finding subscribers, on such projects she has worked with other flautists including Robert Dick and Don Hulbert. She is a member of the London Handel Players which has recorded many discs of period music on period instruments, in addition to performing regularly at the London Handel Festival and throughout the world.

== Personal life ==
Brown is married to a violinist and has a young daughter.

== Discography ==
- Private Passion; Rachel Brown, flute (Quantz flute sonatas composed for Frederick the Great, performed on copies of original instruments)
- Telemann Fantasias; Rachel Brown, baroque flute (Telemann fantasias for solo flute, performed on baroque flute)
- A Tribute to Bach; Rachel Brown, flute (flute sonatas, instrumental works, and arias by J. S. Bach)

== Books and publications ==
- The Early Flute: A Practical Guide, Rachel Brown (2002)
- Cadenzas for the Bärenreiter edition of Mozart's flute concertos
