= East Cork =

Locality in County Cork, Ireland

Coordinates: 51°50′N 8°18′W

East Cork lies in south-west Ireland, in Ireland's largest county, County Cork. The term "East Cork" is used in tourism, sporting and other contexts, and is the name given to one of eight municipal districts of Cork County Council.

East Cork contains one of the world's largest natural harbours, Cork Harbour. Fota Island (including Fota House and Gardens and Fota Wildlife Park) is also east of Cork City, and Fota Island Golf Course hosted the Irish Open golf tournament in 2001.

Towns and "key villages" in the East Cork municipal district of Cork County Council include Midleton, Youghal, Castlemartyr, Cloyne, Killeagh, Whitegate and Aghada. Other smaller villages include Ballynoe, Conna, Ballycotton, Ballymacoda, Dungourney, Ladysbridge, Mogeely, Saleen, and Shanagarry.

== See also ==
- West Cork
- Cork East (Dáil constituency)
- East Cork Early Music Festival
