= Barringer =

Barringer is a surname. Notable people with the surname include:

- Anthony R. Barringer (1925–2009), Canadian/American geophysicist and inventor
- Daniel Barringer (1860–1929), American geologist best known for proving the Meteor Crater to be an impact crater
- Daniel Laurens Barringer (1788–1832), U.S. Congressman from North Carolina, 1825–1834.
- Daniel Moreau Barringer (1806–1873), U.S. Congressman from North Carolina, 1843–1848.
- Emily Barringer (1876–1961), American and the first female ambulance surgeon and the first woman to secure a surgical residency
- Ethel Barringer (1883–1925), South Australian artist, sister-in-law to Gwen Barringer
- Gwen Barringer (1882–1960) South Australian watercolorist
- Jennifer Simpson, née Barringer, (born 1986), American track and field athlete
- Leslie Barringer (1895–1968), British fantasy author
- Patricia Barringer (1924–2007), All-American Girls Professional Baseball League player and manager
- Rufus Barringer (1821–1895), Confederate military general from North Carolina during the American Civil War
- William H. Barringer (1841–1917), Union hero of the American Civil War
- William N. Barringer, superintendent of Newark Public Schools for whom Barringer High School is named

== See also ==
- Barringer Township
- Barranger
- The Barringer Crater (or The Meteor Crater), located near Flagstaff, Arizona, one of the largest and best-known meteorite craters on Earth
- Barringer Farmhouse, an historic structure located in Rhinebeck, New York
- Barringer High School, in Newark, New Jersey
- Barringer Hill, a geological and mineralogical site in central Texas
- The Barringer Hotel, an historic hotel building located at Charlotte, North Carolina
- The Barringer lunar crater, posthumously named after Daniel Barringer
- The Barringer Mansion, an historic home located at Charlottesville, Virginia
- The Barringer Medal, given annually by the Meteoritical Society for research on impact cratering and allied fields
- The Barringer Trophy, awarded for the greatest straight-line distance soaring flight during the previous calendar year
