= Margery Withers =

Australian Artist

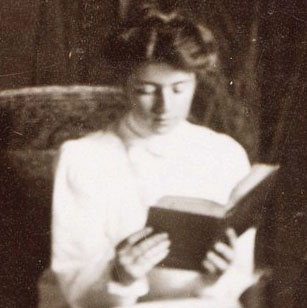
- Margery Withers, circa 1903, State Library Victoria
- Born: 13 January 1890; England, United Kingdom
- Died: 1966 (aged 75–76); Heidelberg, Victoria
- Education: National Gallery School
- Known for: Painting

Margery Pitt Withers (13 January 1890 – 1966) was an Australian artist.

== Biography ==
Born in England to Fanny Flinn and the Australian landscape artist Walter Withers, Margery was brought to Australia aged six months to live at the Charterisville estate in East Ivanhoe, Victoria. Her father worked as an art master at various schools in Melbourne including the Presbyterian Ladies' College, Ruyton Girls' School, the Melbourne Grammar School and Emma Bartlett Cook's Private Girls' School. Margery Withers studied art at the National Gallery School and the Working Men's College. At the National Gallery School, Withers won nine prizes and was awarded a special prize of £50 by the National Gallery Trustees for her picture The Letter.

Withers was engaged to fellow student, John (Jack) Martin Paterson, who dedicated a sketch of a kitten to her while a soldier during World War 1. He was killed in action at Villers-Bretonneux in August 1918. In 1927 Withers married Richard Matthew McCann, an artist and a founding member of Twenty Melbourne Painters.

Withers painted figures and landscapes in both oil and watercolours, and taught art at Swinburne College for several years, though as a married woman she was asked to resign in 1928 and reapply for a temporary position, without benefits. Her work has been described as "finding charm in every shadow and light under her brush."

She painted at Tawonga, Diamond Creek, and Heidelberg, and exhibited with the Victorian Artists Society and the Twenty Melbourne Painters Society. She also showed with artists such as Polly Hurry, Jo Sweatman, and A.M.E. Bale.

Withers has works in the collections of the Art Gallery of New South Wales, the Castlemaine Art Gallery and Historical Museum, the University of Western Australia and the State Library Victoria. Her portrait of her husband Richard McCann was shortlisted for the Archibald Prize in 1939.

== Works ==
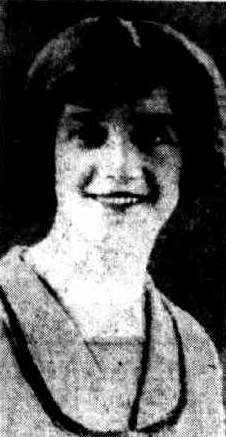
Miss Margery Withers The Herald, 1928

- 1910, Early Eltham looking towards Montmorency]
- ca. 1913–1922, Nude study of a young woman
- ca. 1913–1922, A Warrandyte Farm, near Frank Crozier's
- 1920, Kit Turner's Cottage, Eltham
- 1920, Souter's College, Eltham
- 1920, Studley Park
- ca. 1920–1940, Christ Church, South Yarra
- 1924, Bridge and piers
- 1932, Yarra floods and North Balwyn from Ivanhoe-Boulevard
- 1935, Portrait of unidentified young woman
- 1945, Orchard country, North Eltham

== Exhibitions ==
- Walter and Margery Withers, Collins House, 1915
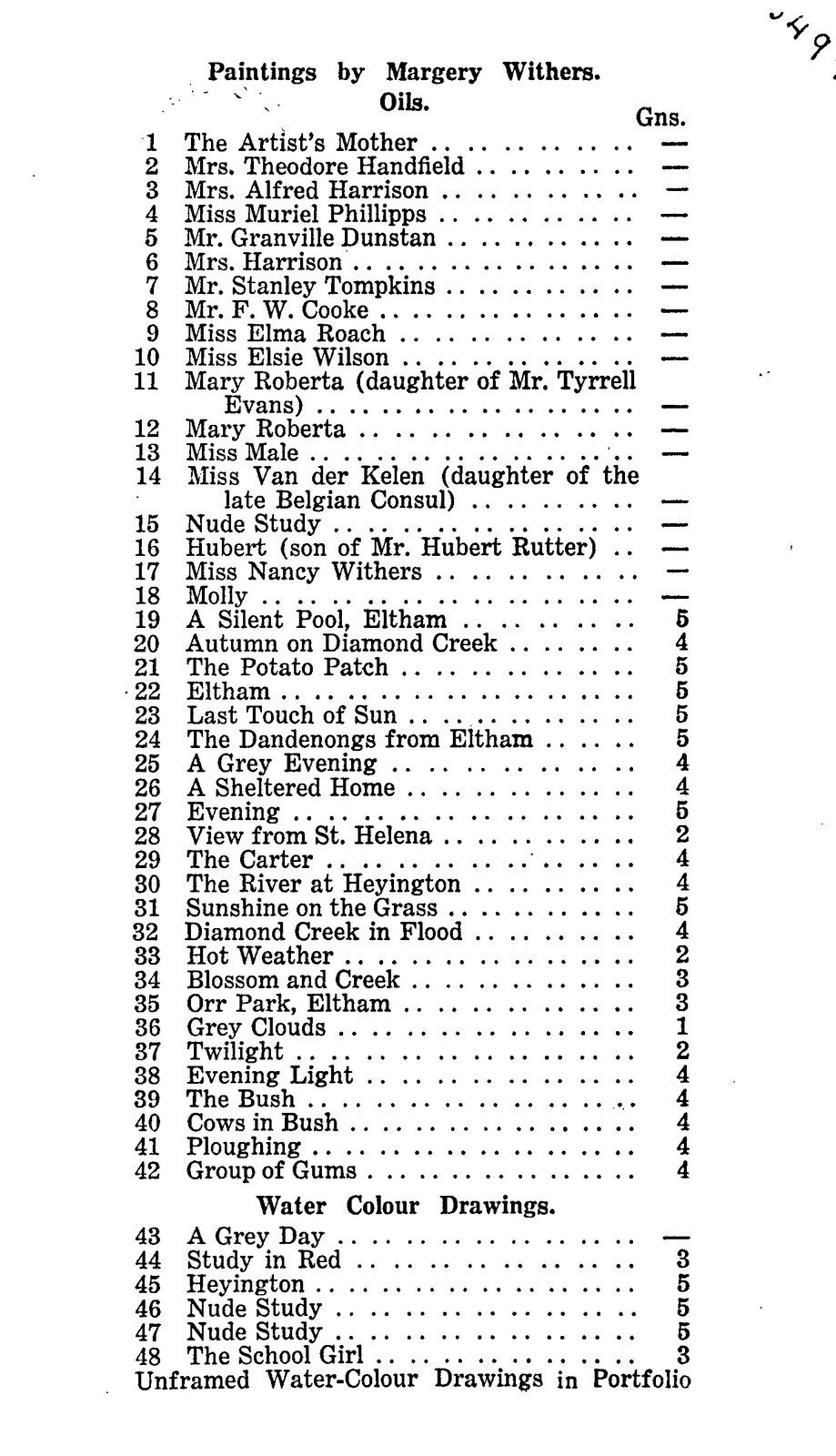
- Catalogue of paintings by Margery Withers, 1922 [State Library Victoria]
  Walter and Margery Withers (watercolours), Athenaeum Hall, 1916
- Solo exhibition, Athenaeum Gallery, 1919
- The Baldwin Spencer Collection of Australian Pictures and Works of Art, Fine Art Society's Galleries (Melbourne), 1919
- Twenty Melbourne Painters 3rd annual exhibition, Athenaeum Hall, 1921
- Group exhibition (Margery, Nancy & Meynell Withers), Athenaeum Hall, 1922
- Twenty Melbourne Painters, Athenaeum Hall, 1923
- Twenty Melbourne Painters, Athenaeum Hall, 1925
- Twenty Melbourne Painters 8th annual exhibition, Athenaeum Gallery, 1926
- Twenty Melbourne Painters, Athenaeum Hall, 1927
- Twenty Melbourne Painters 10th annual exhibition, Athenaeum Hall, 1928
- Solo exhibition, Athenaeum Gallery, 1929
- Twenty Melbourne Painters, Athenaeum Gallery, 1929
- Exhibition by Mr Ernest Buckmaster, Athenaeum Gallery, 1930
- Solo exhibition, Athenaeum Gallery, 1932
- Warrandyte Art Exhibition, Penleigh Boyd Studio, 1932
- Rookwood Gallery opening, 1933
- Heidelberg and District Art Exhibition, Ivanhoe Hall, 1934
- Twenty Melbourne Painters 16th annual exhibition, Athenaeum Gallery, 1934
- Twenty Melbourne Painters, Athenaeum Gallery, 1935
- Twenty Melbourne Painters 18th annual exhibition, Athenaeum Gallery, 1936
- Heidelberg "Inspiration of Landscape Art" exhibition, Heidelberg Town Hall, 1937
- The Herald Exhibition of Outstanding Pictures of 1937, Athenaeum Gallery, 1938
- Twenty Melbourne Painters, Athenaeum Gallery, 1938
- Heidelberg 3rd art exhibition, Ivanhoe Town Hall, 1940
- Launceston Art Society (Twenty Melbourne Painters), Queen Victoria Museum, 1943
- Twenty Melbourne Painters 26th annual exhibition, Athenaeum Gallery, 1944
- Twenty Melbourne Painters, Athenaeum Gallery, 1945
- Twenty Melbourne Painters, Athenaeum Gallery, 1947
- Twenty Melbourne Painters 30th annual exhibition, Athenaeum Gallery, 1948
