= James Hazel Adamson =

Machinist and inventor

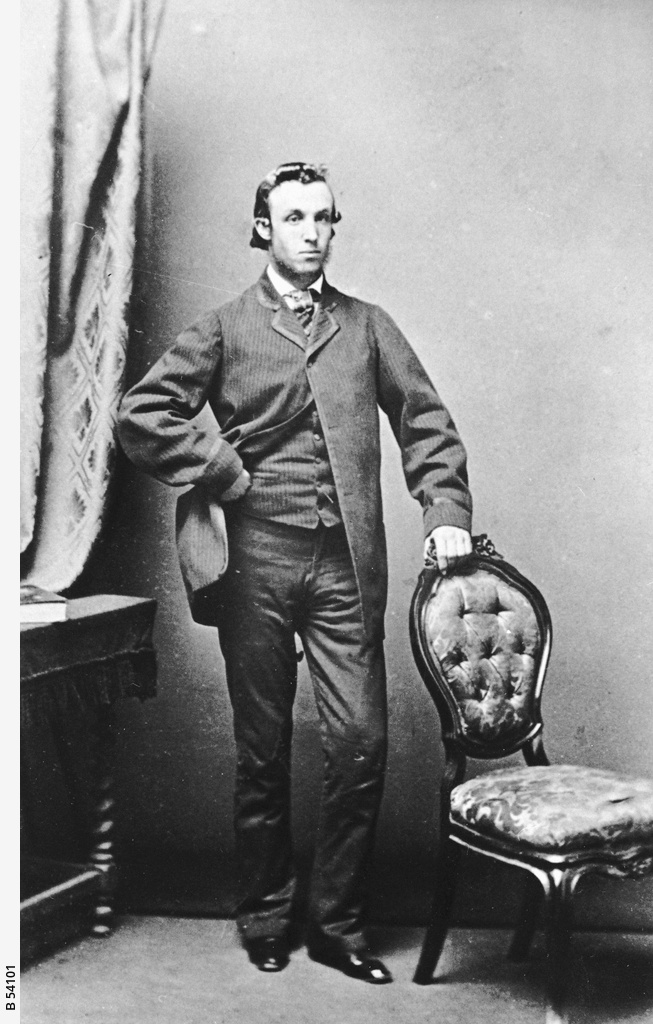
- Born: 27 June 1829; Roxburghshire
- Died: 2 May 1902 (aged 72); Adelaide
- Occupation: Painter

James Hazel (Note: His middle name is recorded as "Hazle" in BDM, in death notices and elsewhere but "Hazel" in all modern references) Adamson (27 June 1829 – 2 May 1902) was a machinist and inventor, better known for his paintings and engravings of marine subjects in the early days of colonisation of South Australia.

== History ==
Adamson was born in Hawick, Roxburghshire, Scotland, one of seven children of wheelwright James Adamson (c. 1790 – 14 August 1864) and Elizabeth May Adamson, née Beveridge (17 September 1795 – 29 March 1870), who arrived in South Australia in September 1839 aboard Recovery from London.

Little is known of his education and training in art, but his eldest brother, Adam, was educated at the High School in Dunfermline and studied art under Joseph Neil Paton, alongside his son (later Sir) Joseph Noel Paton. Adamson worked with his father and brothers as carpenter and wheelwright in their flourishing business on Hanson Street, Adelaide from 1841. In 1853 he built a water-powered flour mill on Smith's Creek near Smithfield.

In February 1854 he held an exhibition in Rundle Street, mostly views of the River Murray and "The Goolwa" (Goolwa, South Australia) and Port Elliot. By March he had a studio in Flinders Street and was painting portraits professionally. In October he released the first of a series of lithographed prints on the same River Murray – Goolwa – Port Elliot themes.

He exhibited several pictures for the competition run in conjunction with the South Australian Society of Arts' first exhibition, held at the Legislative Council chambers in March 1857. His still life received lukewarm praise, but his painting The First Steamer on the Murray, and the Surprise of the Natives won first prize. (Note: The "First Steamer" was the Lady Augusta, which on 25 August 1853 left Goolwa up the Murray with Francis Cadell in command, and reached a point 1,500 miles (2,400 km) up the river before returning.)

By late March 1857 he had opened a photographic studio at 150 Brunswick-street, Collingwood, Victoria. In December 1857 he exhibited a well-received series of nine panoramic views of Melbourne (taken from the newly-completed Houses of Parliament) at the first exhibition of the Victorian Society of Fine Arts. He moved to 67 Collins Street east, and was a successful exhibitor at the February 1858 exhibition of the Victorian Industrial Society. He had a partnership with one Chauncey Leicester as photographic portraitists in 1858 and later in that year was marketing photographic goods with Arthur S. Jackson at the same address, but quit the business late in 1858.

He had not left South Australia completely, as he submitted photographs of scenes in Melbourne and Adelaide suburbs to the East Torrens Institute's annual exhibition in January 1859, and was listed in 1860 by The Northern Star of Kapunda as running the Adamson Brothers farm machinery factory in that town. He was however living at Collingwood in September–October 1859 when he made an oil painting depicting the steamer Ladybird firing a blue flare over the wreck of the Admella, from a sketch by one Johnson (or Johnston), who had visited the spot. The completed painting was exhibited in a shop window on Collins Street five weeks after the tragedy. This painting and another by Adamson were delivered to the South Australian Society of Arts in time to be exhibited, and the companion piece, Rescue of the Survivors of the Admella by the Portland Lifeboat was awarded first prize despite being ineligible on two or three counts: having been submitted after the cutoff date, and painted outside South Australia by a non-resident. The judges' decision was subsequently rescinded.

By 1875 Adamson was living and working in Sydney, with a studio at 279 George Street He exhibited half-a-dozen paintings to the fourth annual exhibition of the New South Wales Academy of Art which met with qualified praise, but won no prizes apart from a certificate of merit.

He returned to South Australia in 1878 to work on the Adamson Brothers' entry for the Government harvester trials and was living at Riverton.

Nothing has been found of his activities in the last decades of the century. He died at his home, Clifton Parade, Goodwood Park and his remains were buried at the West Terrace Cemetery. There was no obituary in the Adelaide newspapers.

== Other activities ==
Though later dissociating himself from Adamson Brothers' carriage and agricultural machinery business, Adamson was involved in development and trials of seeding and harvesting equipment. Between 1863 and 1887 he took out several South Australian patents relating to agricultural machinery. Also:

- He had a role in managing Adamson Brothers' factory at Kapunda, then from around 1866 to 1872 at Auburn.
- In 1867 he was elected president of the Auburn Mutual Improvement Society, which organised an ambitious Conversazione held 5–6 December, donating his oil painting Wreck of the Admella as a major prize. He himself submitted the winning poem on the subject of the Admella.
- On 29 August 1871 while living at Auburn, South Australia (he left in March 1872), he filed a drawing of a harvester (118,574) with the US Patent Office.
- On 1 May 1872 filed British patent "Improvements to Ridley's reaping and dressing machine"
- Travelled to San Francisco via Hawaii and on 23 September 1873 as a resident of San Francisco, filed a patent application for a rotary winnower or grain separator and cleaner.

He tried, unsuccessfully, to establish a farm machinery business in California.

- Adamson was in New Zealand in 1879, but soon returned and was there again when he registered patent 2627 of 9 November 1888 relating to leather drive belts.
- He was a teetotaller and temperance advocate.
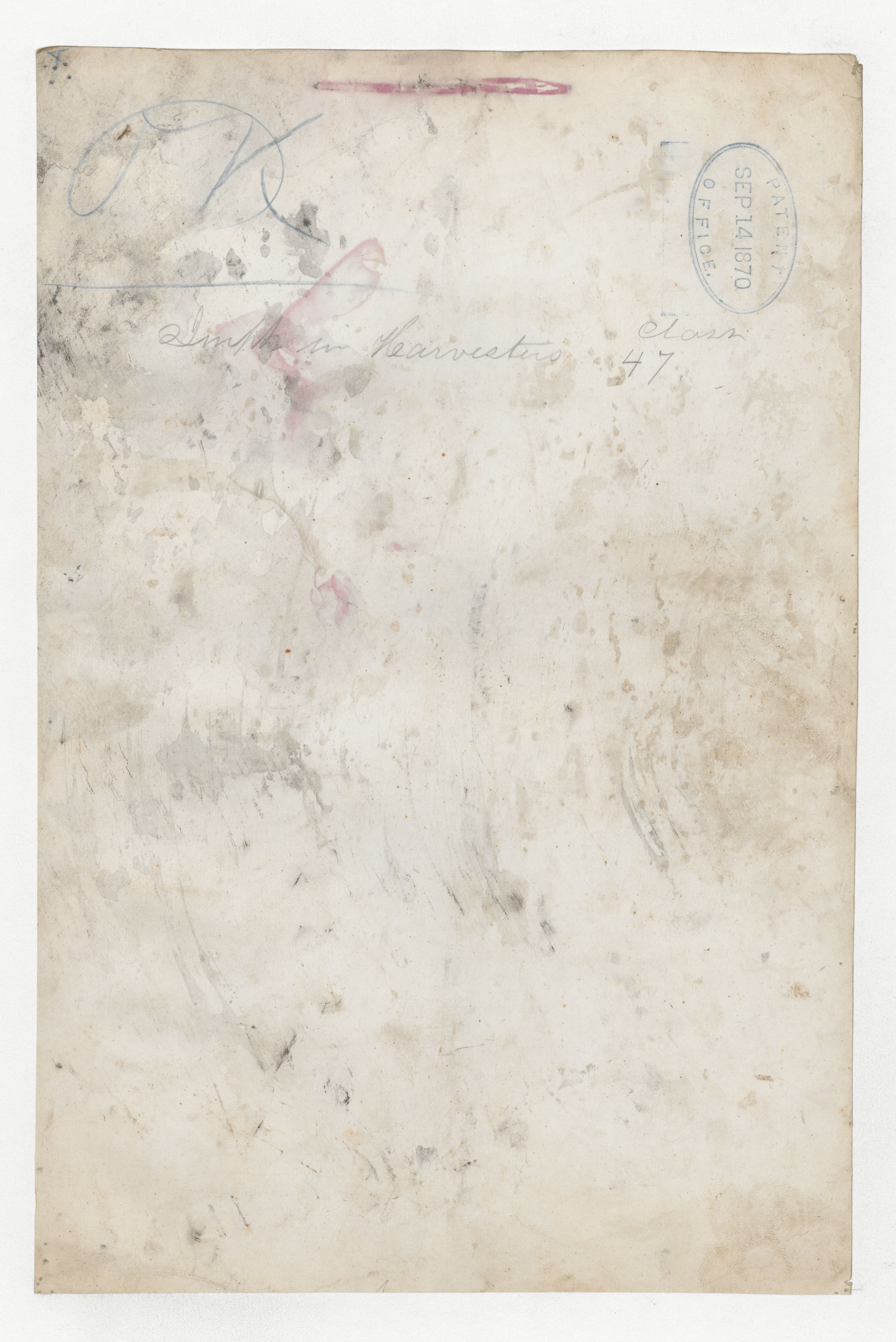
patent for a grain reaper and dresser by John Hazel Adamson

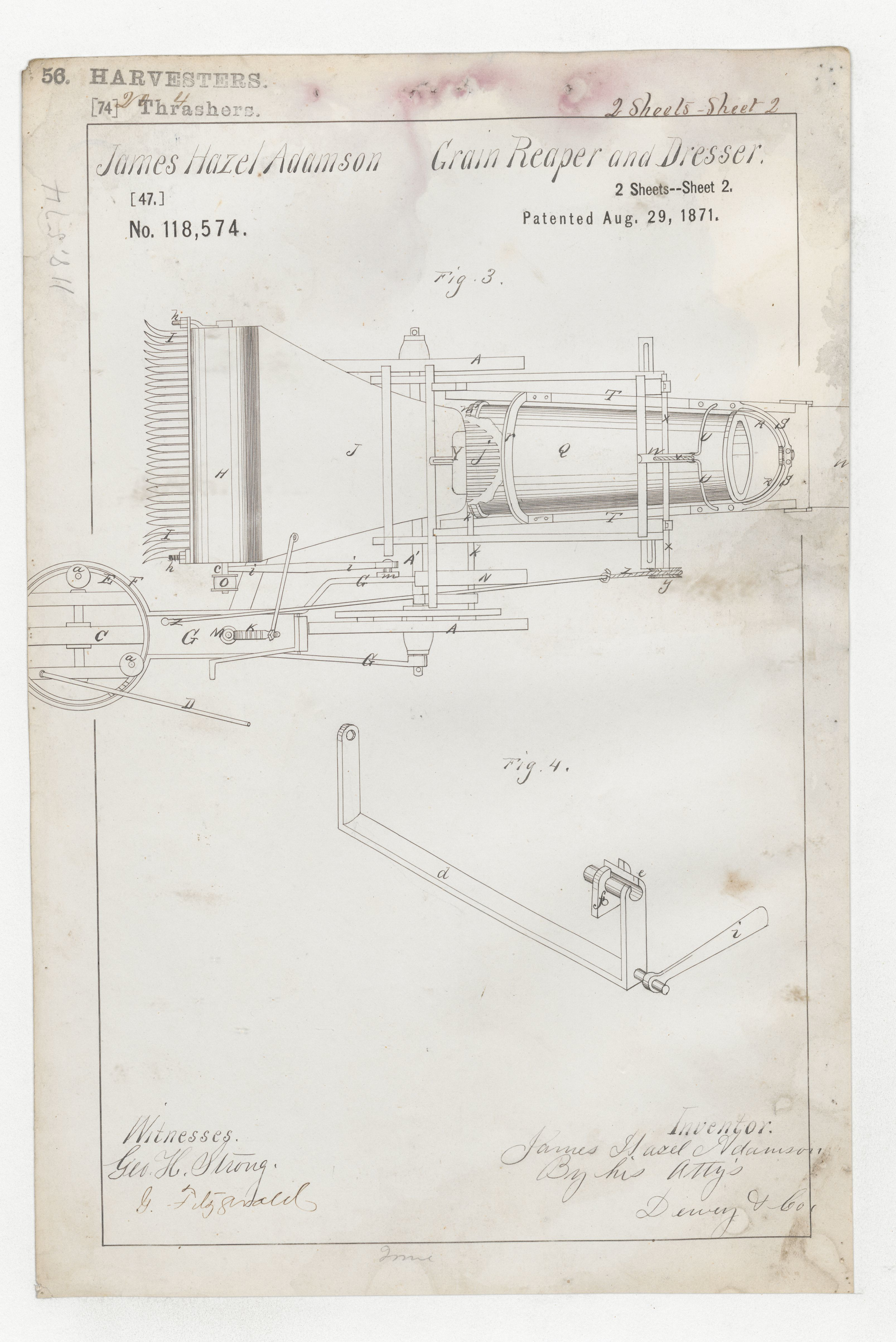
Adamson grain reaper and dresser drawing

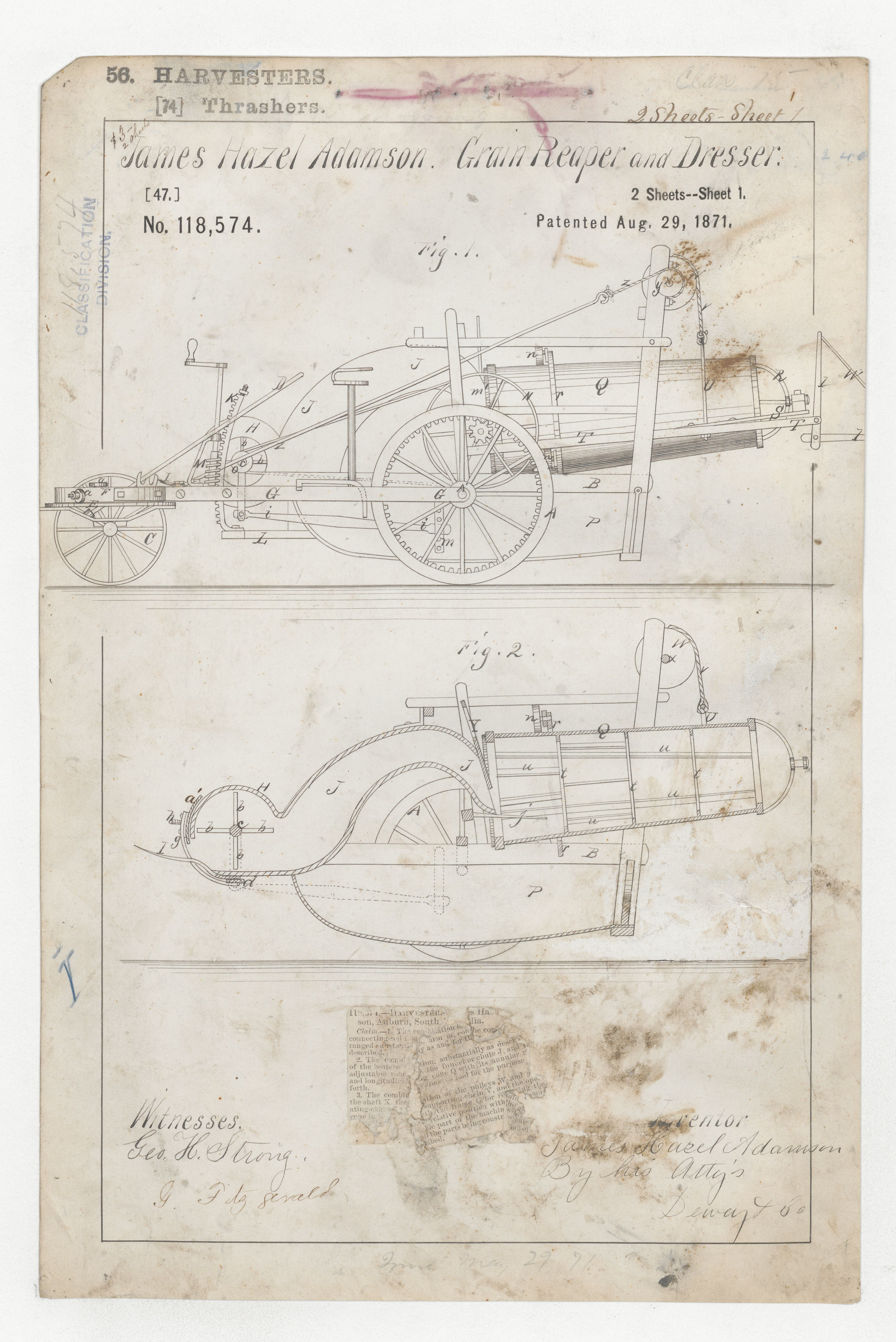
Grain reaper and dresser by Adamson

== Selected works ==
- View of Goolwa with the Lady Augusta approaching the jetty 1854 pencil, brown watercolour wash, white gouache, pen & ink on paper held by the Art Gallery of South Australia.
- Lady Augusta and Eureka, Capt. Cadell's first vessels on the Murray (lithograph, 1854)
- References have been made to a departure from his usual realism: Napoleon's Midnight Review depicting Napoleon I confronting an army of skeletons.
- He was the likely author of his brother David's portrait, held by his family.

== Family ==
Adamson never married. His siblings included:

- Adam Adamson (15 July 1821 – 20 January 1898) "that energetic and useful member of the Chamber of Manufactures . . . ranks amongst the best story-tellers whom I have ever met, and all his stories are as true as they are refreshing.

His granddaughter Gwendoline L'Avence Adamson (1882–1960) married Herbert Page Barringer; known as Gwen Barringer, she was a noted painter.

- David Beveridge Adamson (1823 – 23 June 1891) was a machinist with his father, built wagons and farm equipment with brother Adam, later pursued scientific interests; built his own equatorial telescope. He married twice and had a large family.
- John Beveridge Adamson (10 August 1827 – 28 December 1915) also with the family business.
- Eldest daughter Margaret Thomson Adamson (1834–1913) married James Kelly of Ettrick Farm, Mount Barker on 15 November 1853
