= Peter McIntyre (architect) =

Australian architect and educator (born 1928)

Emeritus Professor Peter McIntyre AO
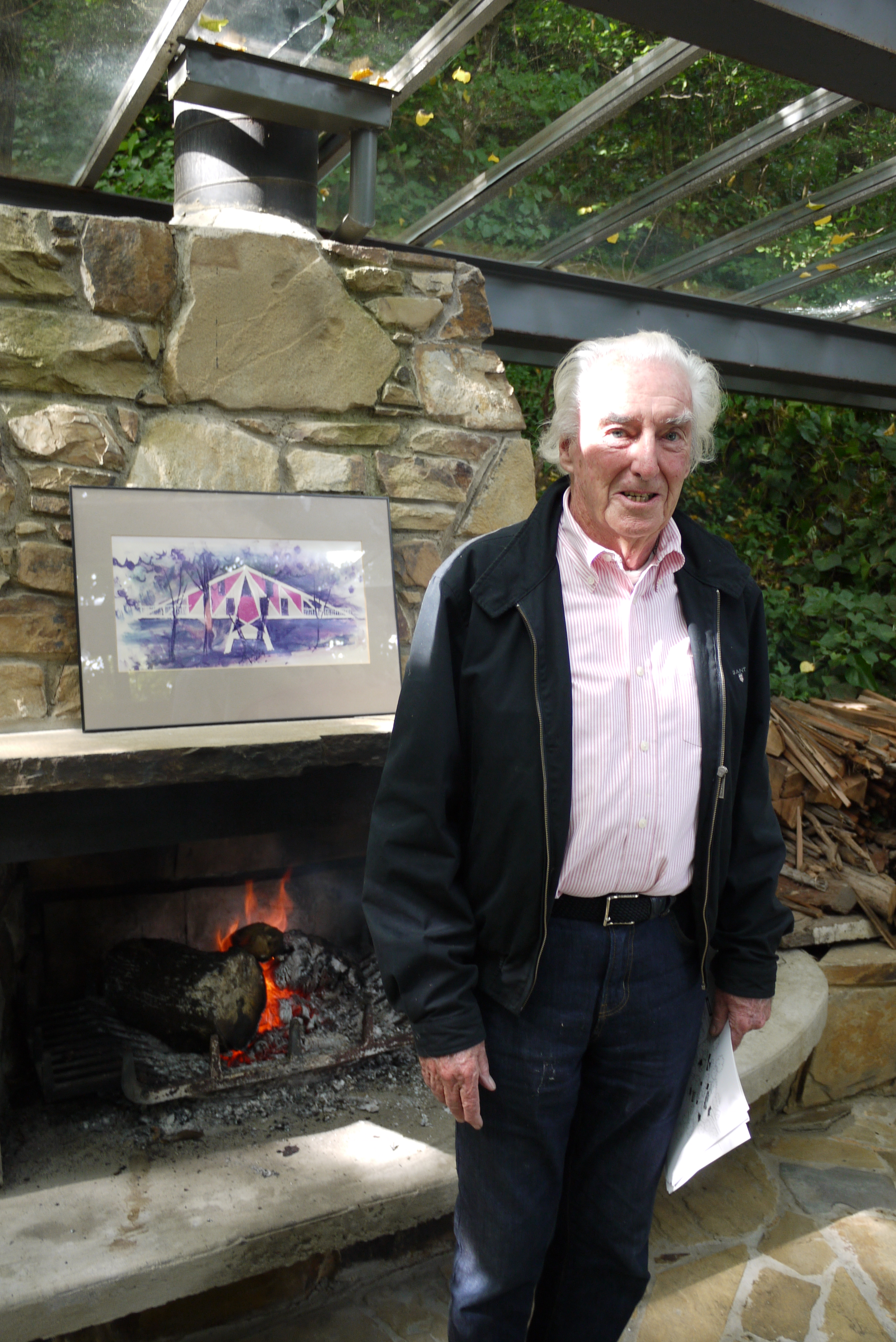
- McIntyre in 2012, with a plan for the McIntyre River House
- Born: 24 August 1928 (age 98)
- Citizenship: Australian
- Education: Trinity Grammar School; Royal Melbourne Institute of Technology; University of Melbourne
- Occupations: Architect and academic
- Years active: 1950—present
- Spouse: Dione McIntyre
- Awards: Robin Boyd Award (1983); Sir Zelman Cowen Award for Public Architecture (1987); RAIA Gold Medal (1990); National Award for Enduring Architecture (2021); Maggie Edmond Enduring Architecture Award (2014, 2021)
- Practice: McIntryre Partnership
- Buildings: River House (1954); Olympic Swimming and Diving Stadium (1956)
- Projects: Dinner Plain Alpine Village (1987)
- Website: mcintyrepartnership.com

Peter McIntyre AO (born 24 August 1928) is a Melbourne-based Australian architect and academic.

== Biography ==
Educated at Trinity Grammar School, McIntyre studied architecture at Royal Melbourne Institute of Technology where, in 1944, he jointly founded the university's student representative council. He completed his masters in architecture at The University of Melbourne in 1950, and, during his studies in 1948, founded the Architects' Revue and continued to serve as a director after his graduation, until 1954.

In 1950, he founded his first architectural practice that combined modern, high-technology materials with concern for "emotional functionalism," or the impact of the built environment on its occupants. His design for an environmentally adapted Mallee Hospital was lauded by critic Robin Boyd as the beginning of a new Australian architecture.

Two years later, he formed a partnership with John and Phyllis Murphy and Kevin Borland and, in collaboration with engineering consultant Bill Irwin, they won the 1952 competition to design the Melbourne Olympic Swimming pool in advance of the 1956 Summer Olympics; and he later had oversight when the pool was redeveloped as the Lexus Centre.

In 1953, he founded the McIntyre Partnership Pty Ltd. in partnership with his wife, Dione, also an architect, and he served as practice director, principal and senior partner. In 1972, McIntyre formed an additional partnership with George Connor and Donald Wolbrink as the International Planning Collaborative — Interplan. In 1973, McIntyre was the author of the City of Melbourne Strategy Plan, which limited high rise development to the central business district's eastern and western shoulders.

He entered numerous architecture competitions and, in 1958, he was successful with the design of the Stawell swimming pool; and was a finalist in competitions for Canberra institutions including the Australian Academy of Science (1957), the National Gallery of Australia (1969), and the National Archives of Australia (1979).

His academic career began in 1950, upon his graduation, when he was appointed as a tutor at Melbourne University and continued until 1957, when he was appointed as a lecturer in charge of architecture students' final year design program at RMIT. He returned to Melbourne University in 1971 in a voluntary capacity on the standing committee for the university's Chair of Architecture. The University appointed him as an associate professor in 1985, and, in 1987, he was appointed as the Chair of Architecture, which he continued to hold until 1992, and delivered the A.S. Hook memorial address in 1990, University of Melbourne. In 1994, McIntyre was appointed as an emeritus professor by Melbourne University.

McIntyre's notable projects included his own 'river' home, Parliament Station, The Jam Factory complex in South Yarra, Westfield Knox in Wantirna South, and the creation of the Dinner Plain Alpine Village near Mount Hotham, Victoria.

== Voluntary activities ==
McIntyre was appointed a councillor of the Royal Victorian Institute of Architects in 1963; served as president of the Victorian chapter of the Royal Australian Institute of Architects in 1968; chaired the Institute's awards jury and Metric Committee in 1970; was a director of the Institute's Architects' Revue in 1971 and again in 1977—1978; chaired the Institute's Sunbury Convention in 1972 and the Heritage Award competition jury in 2004; and served as the Institute's national president during 1973—1974.

In 1980, he was appointed to the Council of Trinity Grammar School and served as president in 1990. Other notable appointments include the Architects Registration Board of Victoria (1963); the Timber Industry Advisory Board (1970); the National Building and Construction Council (1973); served as chair of the Victorian branch of the National Trust's Maritime Museum (1986); was a trustee of the Fountains Trust (1978); chaired the design review committee of the Melbourne Casino Authority that had oversight of the development of Crown Melbourne (1993); chaired competition juries for the Museum of Victoria (1995) and Spencer Street station (2001); and convened the restoration appeal for the Kew Court House, where he also was the consulting architect.

As part of his involvement with Mount Buller, McIntyre served on the Committee of Management from 1966–1971; and was appointed chair of Dinner Plain Pty Ltd in 1984.

== Honours and awards ==
McIntyre was appointed an Officer of the Order of Australia in 1982; was awarded the RAIA Gold Medal in 1990; and appointed an Honorary Fellow of the American Institute of Architects in 1994. Melbourne University conferred McIntyre as an honorary doctor of architecture in 1993 and was appointed as an emeritus professor of architecture in 1994.

=== Architecture awards ===
- Architecture and Arts Award, 1954: Snelleman house, in Ivanhoe East, Melbourne
- Architecture and Arts Award, 1954—1955: McIntyre House, Melbourne
- Architecture and Arts Award, Building of the Year, 1956: Olympic Swimming Stadium, Melbourne
- Sir James Barrett Memorial Medal, 1974: Melbourne Strategy Plan
- RAIA Architectural Projects Award, 1975: The Jam Factory, Melbourne
- RAIA Urban & Community Design Bronze Medal: Melbourne Strategy Plan
- IES Meritorious Lighting Award, 1978: Westfield Knox, Victoria
- RAIA Bronze Medal, 1978: Westfield Knox, Victoria
- RAIA Merit Award 1980: Kyla Park Housing Development, NSW
- RAIA Robin Boyd Award, 1983: Sea House, Mornington, Victoria
- RAIA Merit Award, 1985: Parliament Station, Melbourne
- RAIA Sir Zelman Cowen Award for Public Architecture, 1987: Dinner Plain Alpine Village, Victoria
- RAIA Gold Medal, 1990
- AIA Commendation, 2013: Richard and Elizabeth Tudor Centre at Trinity Grammar
- Maggie Edmond Enduring Architecture Award, 2014: McIntyre River House, 1954
- Maggie Edmond Enduring Architecture Award, 2021: Swimming and Diving Stadium, 1956
- National Award for Enduring Architecture, 2021: Swimming and Diving Stadium, 1956

== Film ==
- 1960 Your House and Mine, directed by Peter McIntyre, distributed by State Film Centre.
