= Sedon Galleries =

Australian art gallery, 1925–1959

Sedon Galleries was a commercial art gallery in Melbourne, Australia, representing Australian traditional, impressionist and post-impressionist painting and prints. It operated from 1925 to 1959.

== Background ==
The gallery's proprietor was William Richard Sedon, who was born in Adelaide on 20 June 1876, the only child of English-born Thomas Sedon and his lover, Jane Franklin Kyle, and who grew up in Creswick where his father had gold-mining interests, and in the same town as the family of artists he later represented, the Lindsays. After his father was jailed in 1903 for fraud, Sedon moved with his mother to 88 Belgravia Street in working-class inner-suburban Richmond. From the age of 20, he started dealing in art, drawing on the collection of his maternal grandmother. His marriage in June 1916, to Isabel Constance Crawford brought wealth from her inheritance in 1919 and the couple moved to 3 Russell St., Camberwell.

== Establishment and influence ==
On 13 October 1925 Sedon opened The Sedon Galleries, on the fourth floor of the Hardware Chambers (demolished 1972), which had been recently renovated after a fire, at 231 Elizabeth Street, opposite the GPO. The inaugural exhibition was Leading Australian Artists; Arthur Streeton, Walter Withers, Elioth Gruner, Norman Lindsay, R. W. Sturgess, W. D. Knox, Nora Gordon, Gwen Barringer, Carl Hampel, and M. J. MacNally, and, in other shows, those emerging, including watercolourist Harold Herbert, Carlyle Jackson, Bernice Edwell and others still aged in their 20s or 30s. Tonalist Max Meldrum’s 'Twenty Melbourne Painters Society' met in the same building and Sedon regularly exhibited its artists.

For the first decade, graphic art works were a substantial part of his sales, many assisted by his good relations with the National Gallery of Victoria print room, and the Felton Bequest selection committee which on one occasion met in the Galleries' chambers.

Arthur Streeton, Blamire Young and Harold Herbert, exhibitors at the gallery, were also art critics on Melbourne papers who provided favourable and often lengthy reviews of its shows. Though Young in a 1929 Herald review was excited by "fashionable" British painters' "Interesting Pictures" being offered at the prices "the same as would be asked In a London gallery," Sedon more consistently promoted Australian art.

He enjoyed contacts in major state galleries through artists who had exhibited with him and who had progressed into influential positions in those institutions. Robert Campbell was appointed as Director of Art at the Launceston Technical School in 1941, and kept up correspondence with him in subsequent roles as the inaugural Director of the Queensland Art Gallery (1949–51) and as Director at the Art Gallery of South Australia (1951–67). Will Ashton, an earlier Director of the Art Gallery of New South Wales (1937–1945), was another exhibitor at the Sedon Galleries who was in regular contact and who introduced Sydney artist John Kilgour and Hilda Rix Nicholas to him as prospective exhibitors.

== Expansion ==
Following the death of his wife Isabel at age 53 on 13 January 1928, Sedon sold their home and a large part of his collection of ornaments, statuary, pictures, crystal, and works by significant Australian impressionists. With the proceeds, he built a second home not far away at 49 Mangarra Road, Canterbury, gave it the same name, and incorporated a capacious gallery to house his future purchases, including a Corot.

The Bulletin described him as ‘'one of our foremost dealers’. and the business emerged from the Great Depression unscathed. Its annual Christmas exhibitions of etchings become a profitable highlight in the artistic calendar. The space expanded to fill more of the Hardware Chambers building in 1929 before moving in 1930 to larger quarters nearby in Elizabeth House, 340 Little Collins Street, into its basement in 1936, then in April 1937 relocated to 107 Elizabeth Street in the Robertson and Mullens (now Angus and Robertson) building above the bookshop in a district known for arts and literature, including bookseller Margareta Webber and galleries The New, The Decoration and Joshua McClelland's Little Galleries. Among guests to his home were artists John Longstaff, W. B. McInnes, Napier Waller, Dora Wilson, George Bell, and prominent members of Melbourne's medical and professional circles.

== Conservatism ==
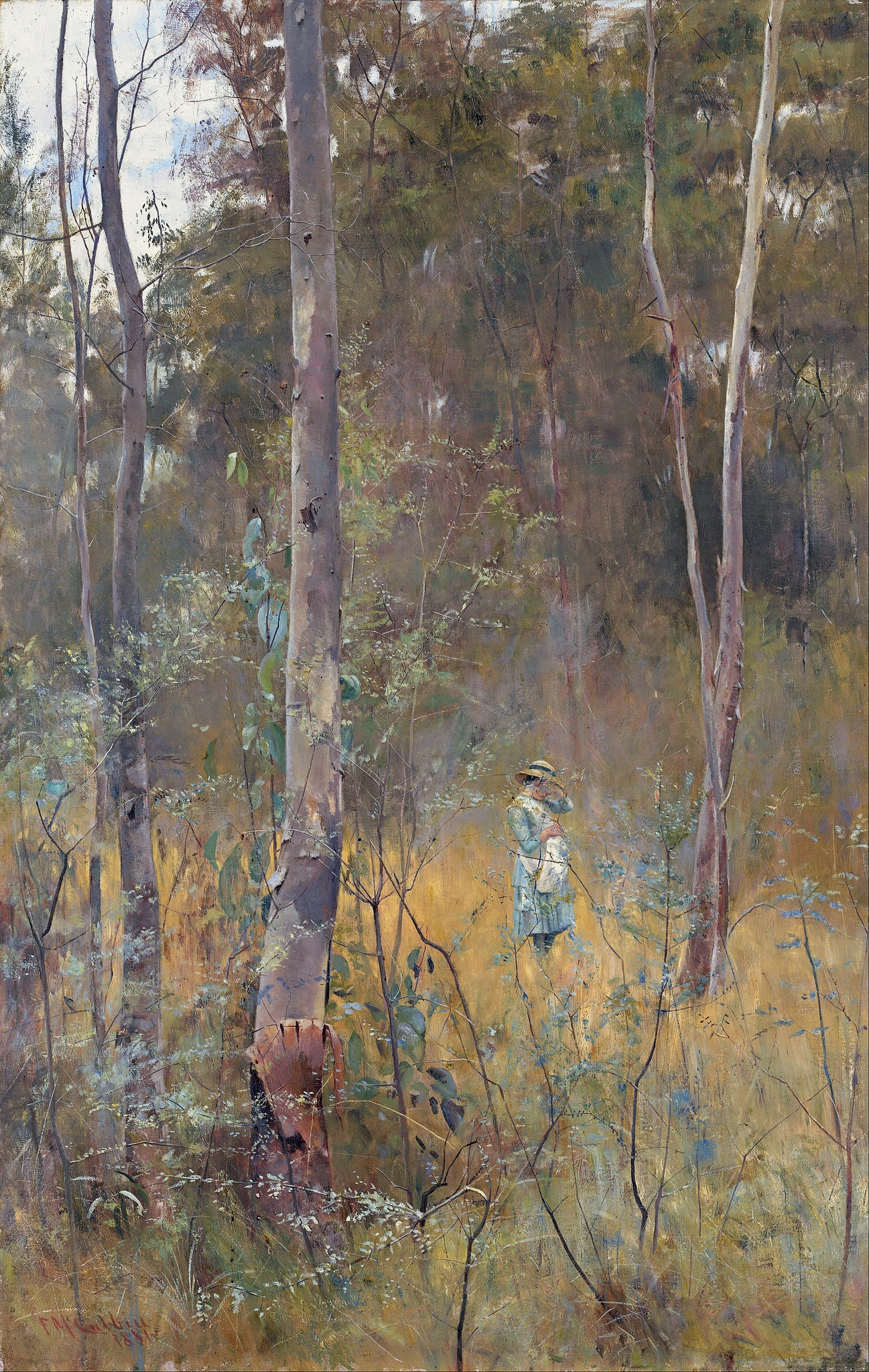
Frederick McCubbin (1886) Lost, exhibited by Sedon in 1931(at 600 guineas) and in a solo retrospective of McCubbin's oil paintings in September 1941, and sold to the National Gallery of Victoria

Sedon Galleries' Exhibition of Oils & Water-Colors by the Master Painters of the '90s in 1931 signified the Galleries’ conservatism and alignment with traditionalist art, typified in its representation of Louis Buvelot and Charles Conder, and of Australian Impressionism, with solo shows by Streeton and McCubbin work throughout the late 1940s and into the 1950s.

In October 1941, the National Gallery of Victoria belatedly expanded its Australian Impressionist collection with McCubbin's Lost (1886), exhibited by Sedon in 1931 with North Wind and Self Portrait, all purchased for the NGV's collection through the Felton Bequest. Sedon's conservatism was further demonstrated in his contributing the gallery as the venue for an exhibition to defray the costs of artists Mary Edwards' and Joseph Wolinski's court case over William Dobell's winning 1943 Archibald Prize with his portrait of Joshua Smith. That year the gallery enjoyed the endorsement of the Liberal (conservative party) MP Robert Menzies who opened an exhibition of Harold Herbert's work.

As late as 1951, in response to a show there, an unnamed Age art reviewer remarked that; "The Sedon Galleries continue firm in their policy of presenting work by members of the Heidelberg school and its present-day adherents."

On the other hand, by 1935 an uncredited review in The Herald indicated in a paragraph 'Norman Lindsay in Retrospect', that fresher offerings might be welcome:

The Norman Lindsay etchings are all familiar. The immediate impression one takes from a re-examination of these excitable etchings is that, although they are astonishingly competent in their textures, they are deficient in design [achieving] dynamic effects from emotional intensity rather than from any purely artistic source. The etchings appeal to the romantic vision, not to the pure vision, which looks for line and form and the basic elements of design."

== Decline ==
After World War II, Australian critics’ attention, and buyers’ interest, turned away from traditional art by the likes of Norman Lindsay and Hilda Rix Nicholas that Sedon Galleries represented, and embraced the Modernism being shown at new galleries; Velasquez/Tye's (opened 1940), Peter Bray (1949), Mirka's (1953), Gallery of Contemporary Art (1956), Brummels (1956), Australian Galleries (1956), the Museum of Modern Art Australia (1958), and Gallery A (1959). Consequent decrease in sales forced a final move in August 1959 to a shop-front at 150 Burwood Road, Hawthorn. There, Sedon offered up his private collection but struggled to find buyers. He died at home on Friday evening, 18 December 1959, and was buried at Boroondara Cemetery in Kew.

== Exhibitions ==
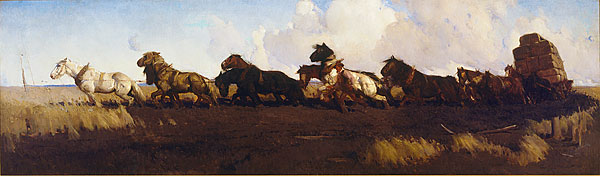
George Lambert (1899) Across the Black Soil Plains, oil on canvas, 91.6 cm H x 305.5 cm W. AGNSW

- 1925: Leading Australian Artists; Arthur Streeton, Walter Withers, Elioth Gruner, Norman Lindsay, R. W. Sturgess, W. D. Knox, Nora Gordon, Gwen Barringer, Carl Hampel, and M. J. MacNally
- 1926, 4–15 May: Walter and C. Meynell Withers, paintings
- 1927, from 22 November: Etchings, woodcuts, miniatures, and lithographs by British, Continental and Australian printmakers.
- 1929, 21 May – 1 June: group show of Australian artists after extensions to the gallery
- 1929, August: British Painters; Alfred Munnings, John Lavery, Algernon Talmage, Laurence Biddle, Tom Mostyn, Davis Richter
- 1929, October/November: European Etchings
- 1929, 26 November – 31 December: etchings, woodcuts and lithographs by sixty-four British, Continental and Australian artists
- 1930, 2–13 September: Group show at the new venue in Elizabeth House
- 1931, April: Drawings and etchings, including work by George Lambert
- 1932, 2–13 August: Percy Lindsay, Landscapes
- 1933, 19–30 September: 1st annual exhibition of oils and water colors by members of the New Melbourne Art Club
- 1934, 6–14 March: Australian Paintings
- 1934, 21 August – 1 September: Will Ashton
- 1934, to 29 September: Gwen Barringner
- 1935, to 2 September: Will Ashton, Norman Lindsay, Lionel Lindsay, John C. Goodchild
- 1935, 19–30 November: Marguerite Mahood
- 1935, December: Annual Etching Show
- 1938, June: Lionel Lindsay
- 1942, December: John Longstaff, Arthur Streeton, Ernest Buckmaster, H. B. Herbert, Penlelgh Boyd, James R. Jackson, Robert Johnson, Daryl Lindsay, Norman Lindsay, Charles Wheeler, William Rowell
- 1943, 10–20 August: Exhibition of Paintings by Miss A.M.E. Bale
- 1945, June: Norman Lindsay, Frederick McCubbin, Blamire Young, Robert Johnston, Will Ashton, Herbert Rose, Norman Macgeorge, John Goodchild and Max Angus. Oils and watercolours
- 1946, March: Water-colours and Oils by J. J. Hilder, R. W. Sturgess, James R. Jackson, Robert. Johnston, Sir John Longstaff, Norman Lindsay, Sir Lionel Lindsay, Charles Wheeler, Will Ashton, Fred McCubbin, Tom Roberts, W. B. Mcinnes, Harold Herbert, W. D. Knox, Blamire Young.
- 1947: November/December: Christmas Show; including Will Ashton, Charles Bryant, W.D. Knox, Lionel Lindsay, Harold Septimus Power, Howard Barron, Benjamin E. Minns, Reginald Sturgess, Evelyn Baxter, Jean Sutherland
- 1951, March: Arthur Streeton, Charles Conder, Will Ashton, Walter Withers
- 1953, March: Group show including Arthur Streeton, McCubbin, Will Ashton, W. B. McInnes, Charles Condor
