= McIntyre River Residence =

Heritage-listed house in Melbourne, Victoria, Australia

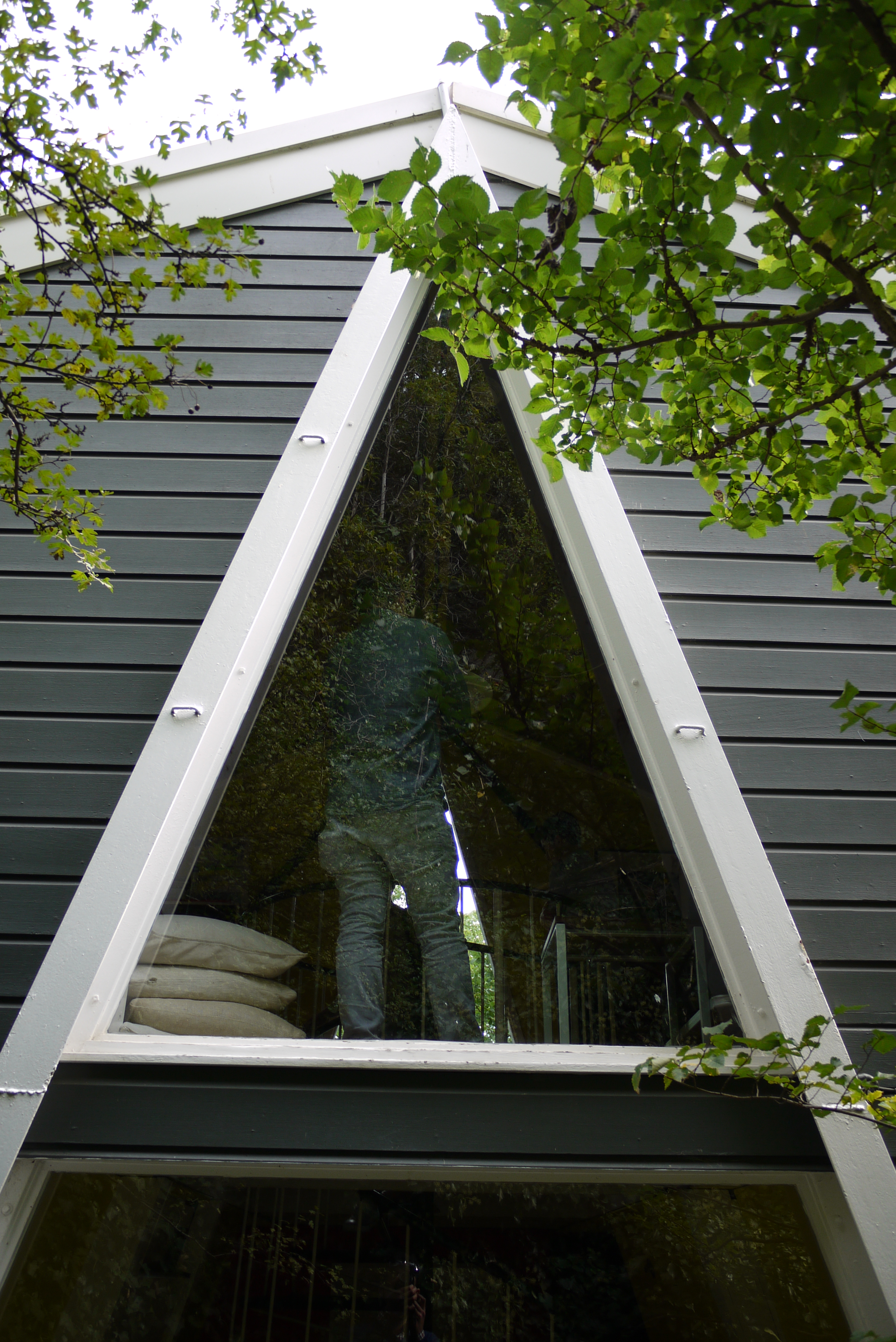
- The A-frame upstairs window of the house

- Location of the house in Greater Metropolitan Melbourne
- Alternative names: River House
- Etymology: Yarra River

General information
- Status: Completed
- Type: House
- Architectural style: Modernist; International Style
- Location: 2 Hodgson Street, Kew, City of Boroondara, Melbourne, Victoria, Australia
- Coordinates: 37°48′36″S 145°00′58″E
- Year built: 1953–1955
- Completed: 1955; 71 years ago
- Renovated: 1960s–1970s
- Client: Peter McIntyre
- Owner: Peter & Dione McIntyre

Technical details
- Structural system: A-frame building; Tensile structure
- Material: Steel; Stramit board
- Grounds: 2 ha (6 acres) (1947)

Design and construction
- Architect: Peter McIntyre AO
- Main contractor: McKinna Brothers
- Awards: Architecture and Arts Award (1954); RVIA award for outstanding architecture (1955); Maggie Edmond Enduring Architecture Award (2014)

Victorian Heritage Register
- Official name: River House
- Type: Registered place
- Criteria: a., d., e., f., h.
- Designated: 19 December 2024
- Reference no.: VHR H2455
- Heritage overlay no.: HO72
- Category: Residential buildings (private)

Register of the National Estate
- Type: Defunct register
- Designated: undated

The McIntyre River Residence, also known as the River House, is a house located at 2 Hodgson Street in Kew, in the City of Boroondara, in the inner eastern suburbs of Melbourne, in Victoria, Australia. It is one of the most notable and well-known buildings by Peter McIntyre AO, a twentieth-century Melbourne architect.

Built between 1953 and 1955 on the traditional lands of the Wurundjeri people, the house was added to the Victorian Heritage Register on 19 December 2024 in recognition of its historical, architectural, aesthetic, and technical significance; and was also added to non-statutory lists by the Victorian branch of the National Trust on 18 June 1990 and by Docomomo Australia as amongst the most notable modern buildings in Victoria.

== History ==
The River House is a modernist residence designed by Peter and Dione McIntyre as their home and constructed during 1953-54 with alterations and additions from the late 1950s and 1960s. It is located on a steeply sloping, treed site on the eastern bank of the Birrarung (Yarra River) at Kew. Given the slope of the site, some considered the site to be unsuited to development due to flood zone regulations and the steep slope.

In 1947, while still a student, Peter McIntyre purchased for A£300, a freehold lot of two hectares (six acres) that fronted the Yarra River and became the site of the River House. McIntyre developed schemes for the house, exploring an approach that used a cantilevered steel A-frame structure, influenced by Norman Mussen, his lecturer on structural engineering at The University of Melbourne.

Bill Irwin, who worked in the same building as McIntyre and Kevin Borland, developed the engineering design for the River House. Irwin had worked as part of the Royal Australian Engineers during World War II and, after completing his engineering studies at the University of Melbourne, begun his own practice in 1953. During the 1950s he contributed to Victoria's most innovative tensile structural engineering projects, including the Sidney Myer Music Bowl and Olympic Swimming Stadium. The structure-led design of the 1950s required creative engineering input, and Irwin was the engineer of choice for a number of key architects of the period. The engineering approach he devised for the River House solved several problems: it used minimal materials to create maximum usable space, enabled efficient use of a tightly constrained site and elevated habitable areas above the flood level. This approach would later prove influential in the design of the Olympic Swimming Stadium. As a result of his commission from the Olympic Swimming Stadium, McIntyre was able to fund construction on the River House from 1953.

Dione Cohen began assisting on the project when she joined McIntyre's practice. Construction was undertaken by the McKinna Brothers. Cohen and McIntyre moved into the house in 1954, the year they married. The brightly coloured and unusually shaped residence, visible from Victoria Bridge, immediately drew the attention of the public and of architectural colleagues.

The house was the primary home of the McIntyres and their four children for twenty years. This necessitated several additions and alterations, some of which have been reversed over time. In the late 1950s, the brightly painted Stramit boards were covered with timber boards. In the 1960s, an additional living area was added below the easternmost wing. The McIntyres moved out of the house in the early 1970s. They returned to the residence when it was used for the practice of the McIntyre Partnership in the 1980s. Dione McIntyre reflected that the ‘River House has always been there.’

The River House has featured in numerous publications, media articles and received several awards and commendations. As a highly visible residence, there was great public interest in it from the moment it was completed. It was featured in Womans Day and in the United States' edition of Vogue when the latter published a special edition on the Melbourne Olympics; and commented that the house was "like some exotic bird of paradise perched high on the densely wooded bank." Robin Boyd wrote about the house in his column in The Herald in 1956 and in his book, Australia's Home. Boyd reflected that '… the home of architects Peter and Dione McIntyre … symbolised the spirit of the new Melbourne house in the mid-1950s… Form and colour raised the spirits of the converted and deliberately jarred the unconverted into recognition that war was declared on conservatism.'

== Description ==
The central structure in the house is a large, steel, triangular frame that is exposed both internally and externally. Branching out from the central frame are two 12-metre (40 ft) cantilevers with a deck at each end. A spiral staircase curls up the central frame, connecting the three levels of the house. Inside is painted in bright primary colours.

It was commended by the Victorian branch of the National Trust as '…structurally and formally, one of the most extraordinary house designs executed in Australia in the 1950s…'; and '…is a period exemplar of the radical stylistic and structural experiments that were taking place in Australian architecture in the post-war years, and is indicative of the optimism and excitement felt by architects when released from the austerity of World War II and the immediate post-war years of material and financial shortages.'

In 2014, the River House was recognised with the Maggie Edmond Enduring Architecture Award, awarded by the Victorian branch of the Australian Institute of Architects. It is one of sixteen twentieth-century Australian residences recognised in the Australian Institute of Architects' list of 'Internationally Significant Residential Architecture' where it was described as 'a daring recipe for post-war living'. It was also recognised by Docomomo Australia as amongst the most notable modern buildings in Victoria.

== Gallery ==
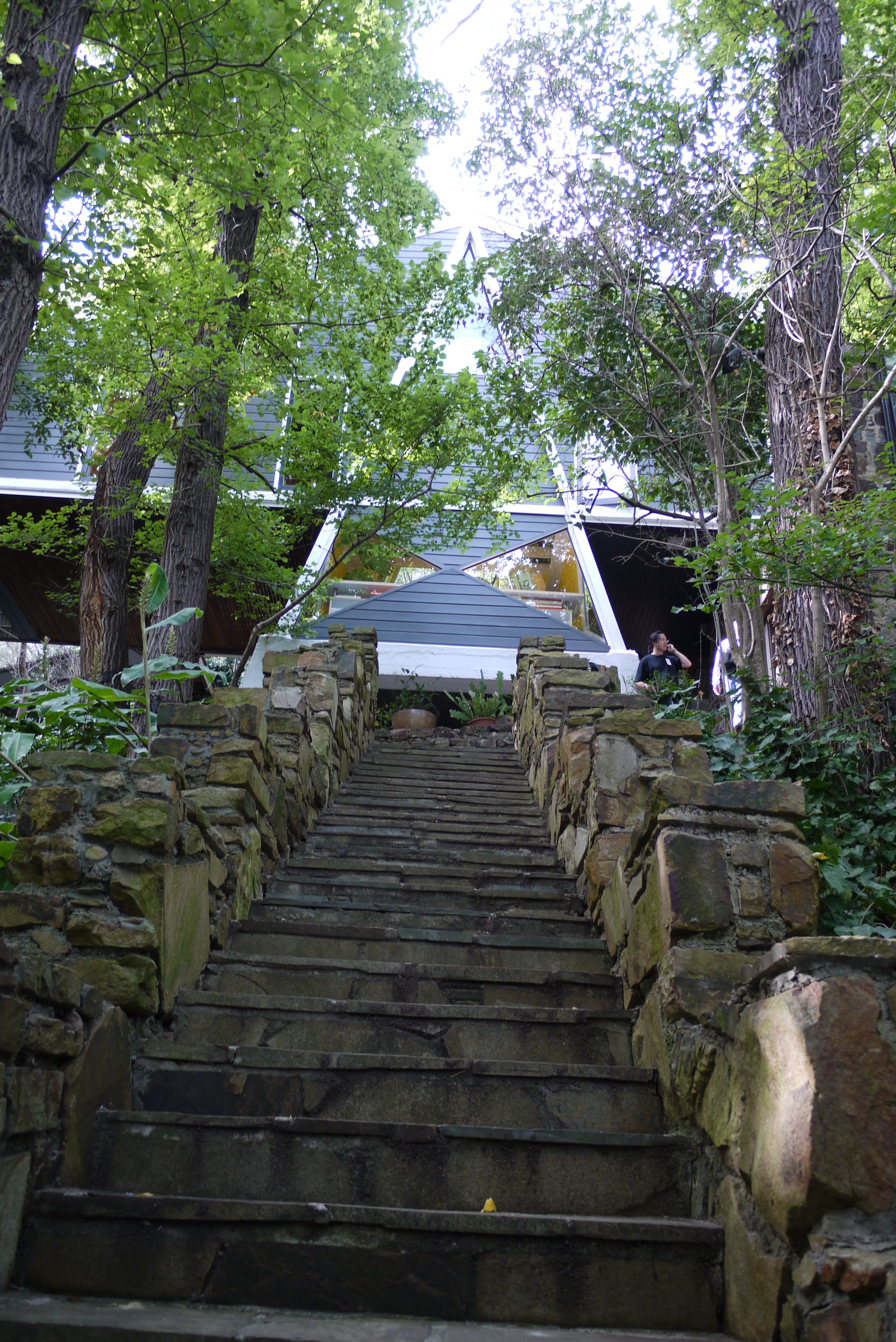
The steps that ascend to the house entry

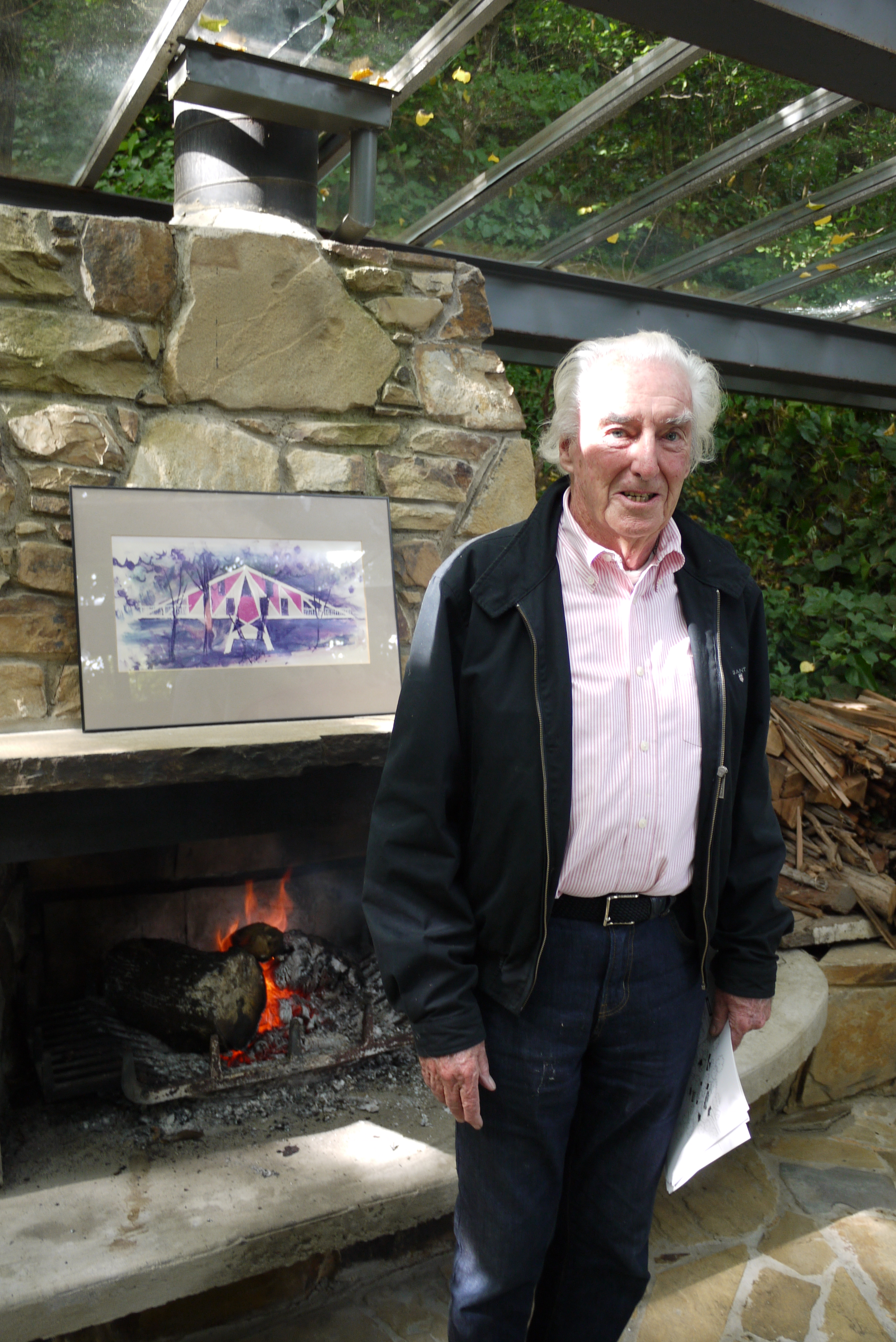
McIntyre standing in front of an artboard with the house design

== See also ==
- Architecture of Melbourne
- List of places on the Victorian Heritage Register in the City of Boroondara
