= Walter Withers =

English-born Australian landscape artist (1854–1914)

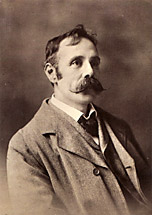
- Withers in 1906
- Born: Walter Herbert Withers; 22 October 1854; Handsworth, Staffordshire, UK
- Died: 13 October 1914 (aged 59); Eltham, Victoria, Australia
- Education: Académie Julian
- Movement: Heidelberg School
- Awards: Wynne Prize; 1897 The Storm
- Elected: Victorian Artists Society

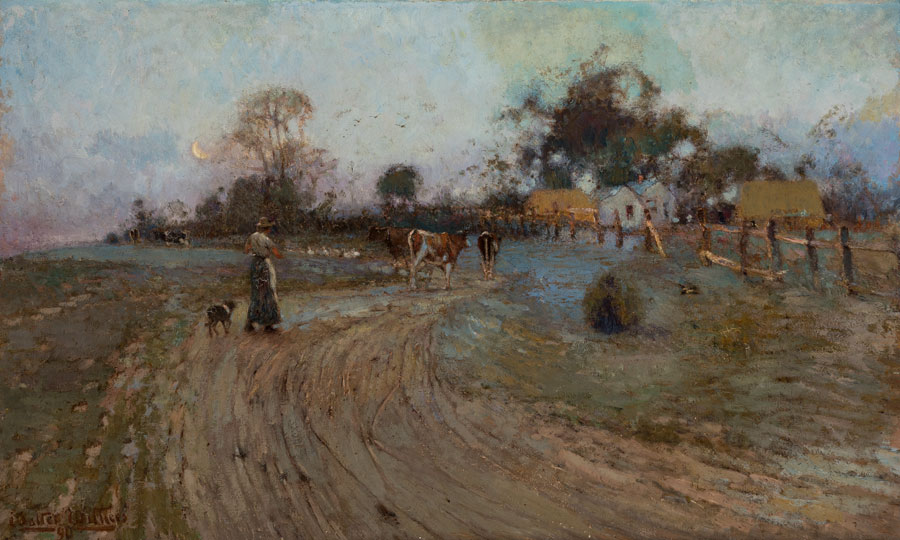
The Farm, 1890

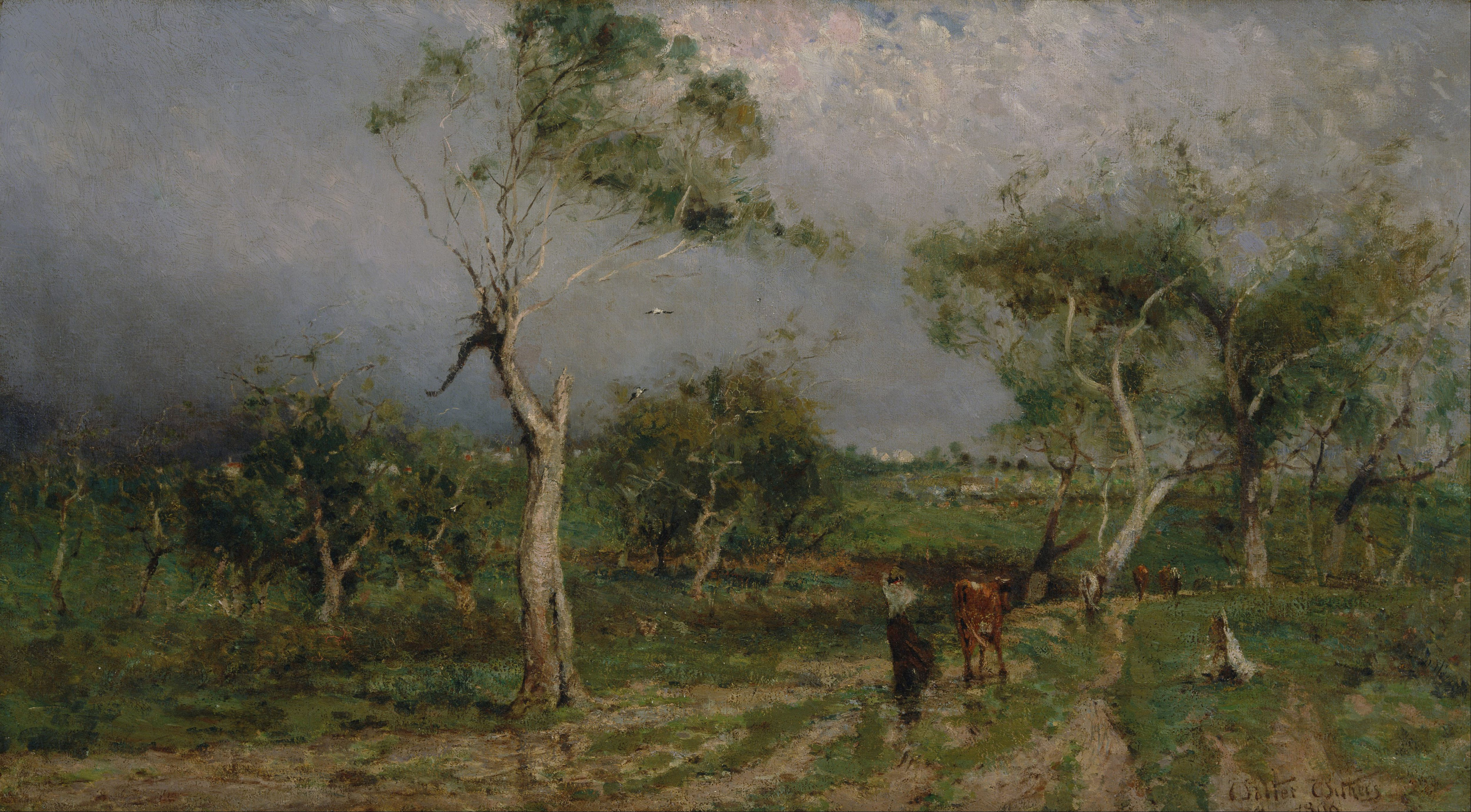
The Storm (1896), winner of the first Wynne Prize

Walter Herbert Withers (22 October 1854 – 13 October 1914) was an English-born Australian landscape artist and a member of the Heidelberg School of Australian impressionists.

== Biography ==
Withers was born on 22 October 1854, at Handsworth, to Edwin Withers. His father objected to his becoming a professional painter.

During the period of his black and white work, Withers executed, in chalk, portraits for reproduction, that of the Count von Bismark being an especially fine example of his work in this direction. In his spare time Withers sought to cultivate his art, and eventually had work accepted for exhibition in the Old Academy, Melbourne.

In 1887, Withers went to Europe, and there he married Fanny Flinn in October. He and his wife settled in a small flat in Paris and he studied at the Académie Julian.

In 1890, Withers and his family moved into Charterisville Estate in East Ivanhoe. In 1903, they moved for the last time to Eltham, to a timber house on the corner of Bolton and Brougham Streets. Here, Withers added a studio, where he painted many works featuring the local landscape.

== Influence ==
Withers's influence as a painter, upon younger art students of his time, was marked. His pupils included Percy Lindsay, and his younger brother Norman Lindsay.

In 1891, he opened a studio in Collins Street West. From 1894, Withers spent the next four years in a cottage in Cape Street, Heidelberg, Victoria. It was here that he painted some of his finest work, of the fin de siècle period.

The Selector's Home, painted in 1895, was an achievement that won the admiration of Arthur Streeton and Fred McCubbin.

After his death his work was successful in exhibitions at Sedon Galleries, where on one occasion it was exhibited with the work of his son, C. Meynell Withers.

He died in Eltham, Victoria, on 13 October 1914 and was outlived by his wife and four children, including Margery Withers, who was also a painter. He was buried at the Anglican Church of Saint Helena.

== Gallery ==
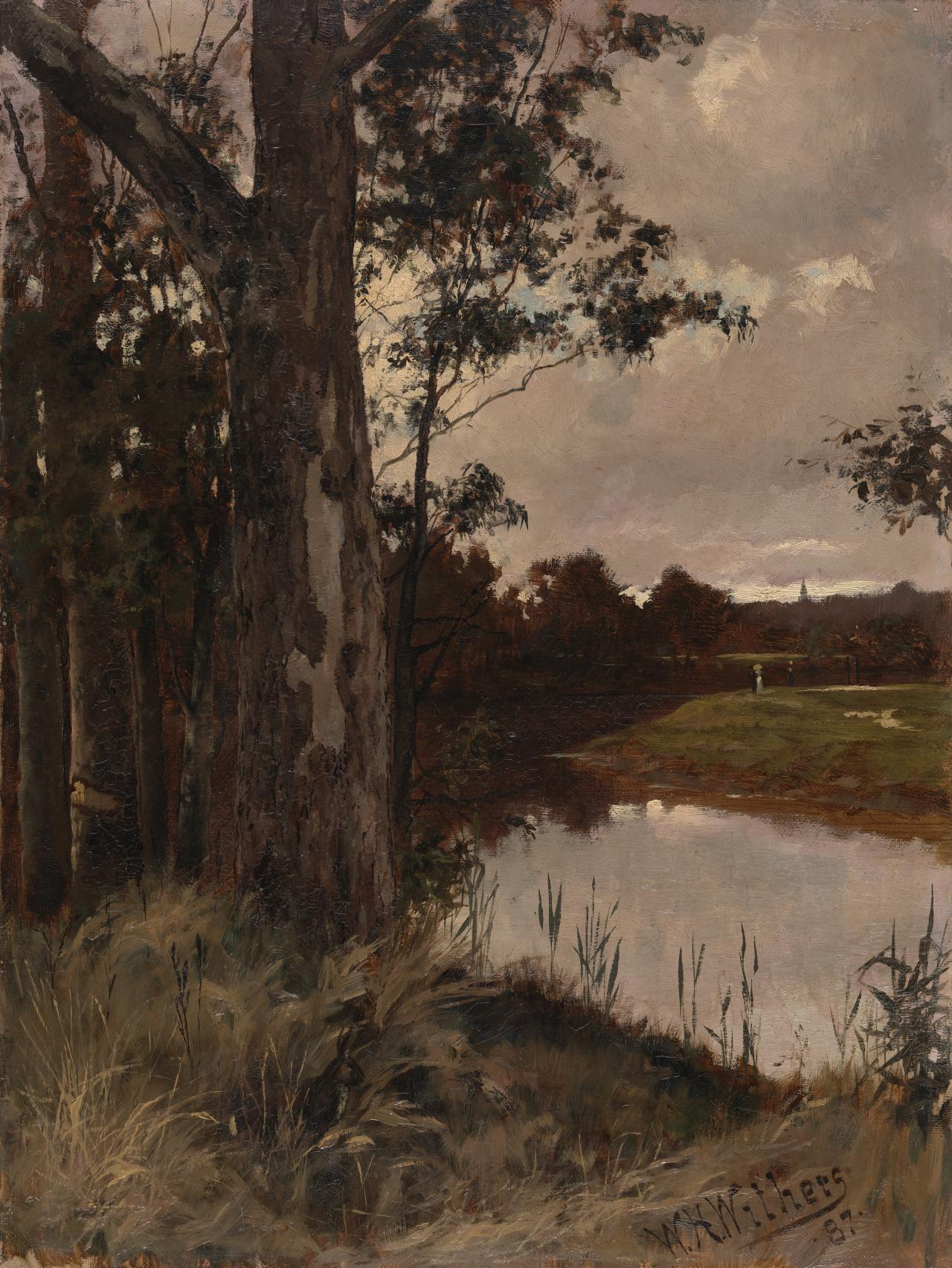
Evening on the Yarra, 1887, National Gallery of Victoria

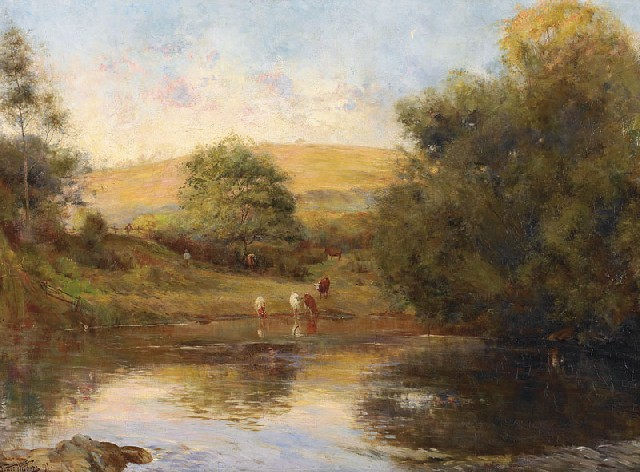
After the Heat of the Day, 1891

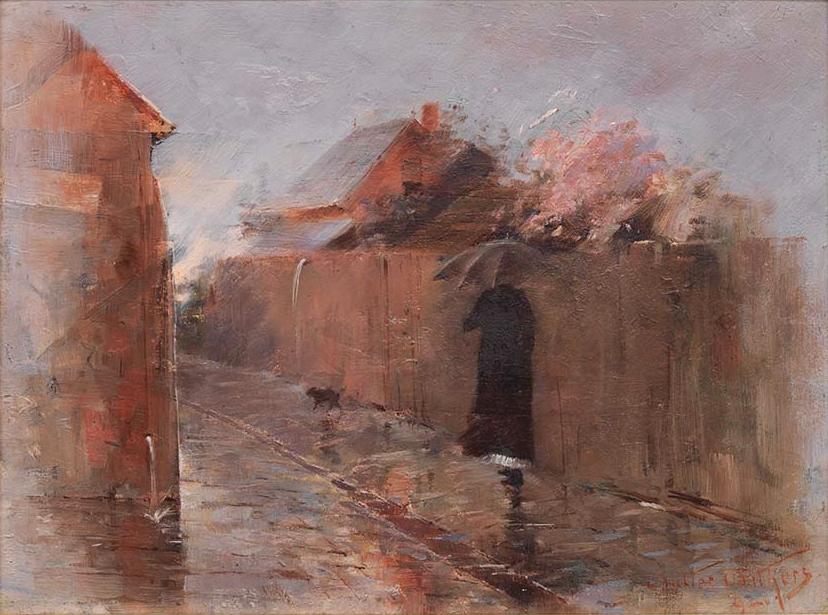
Wet Day, Art Gallery of Queensland, 1892

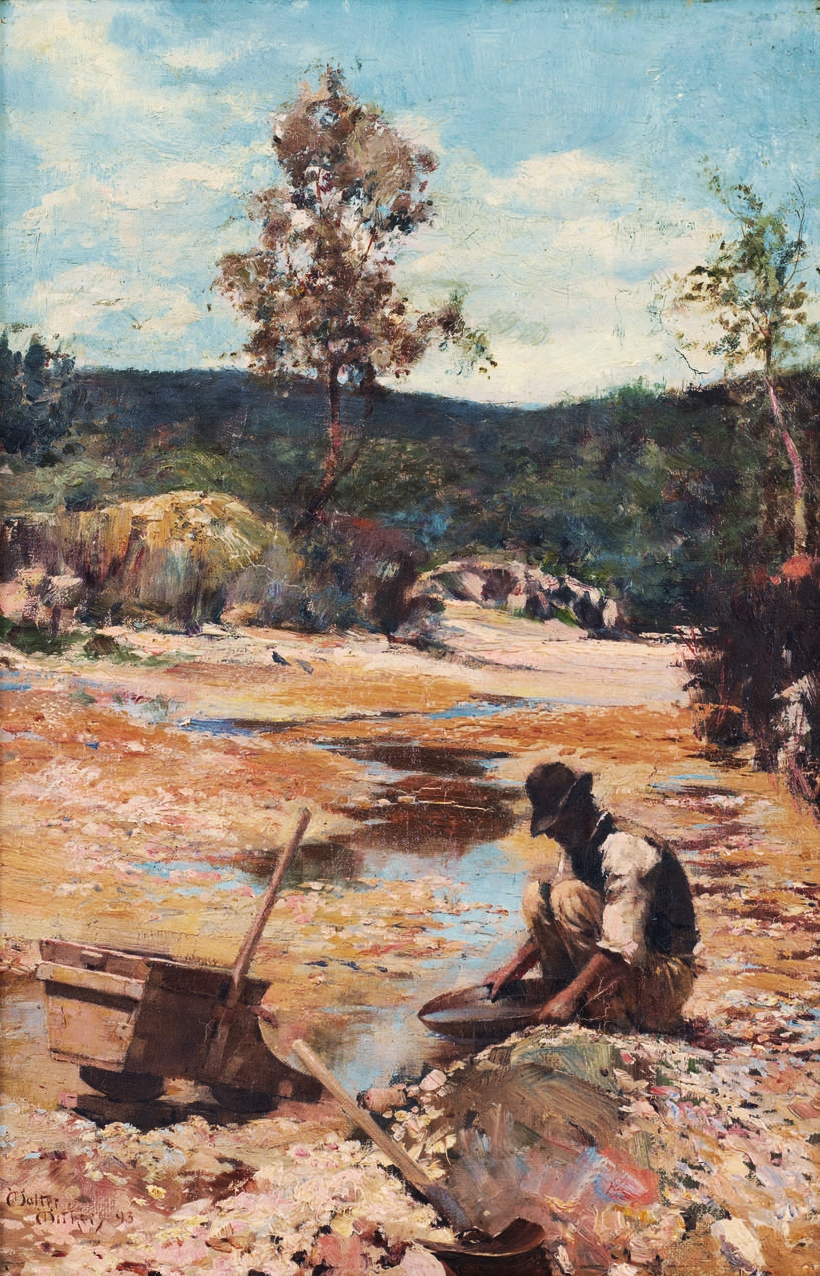
Panning for Gold, private collection, 1893

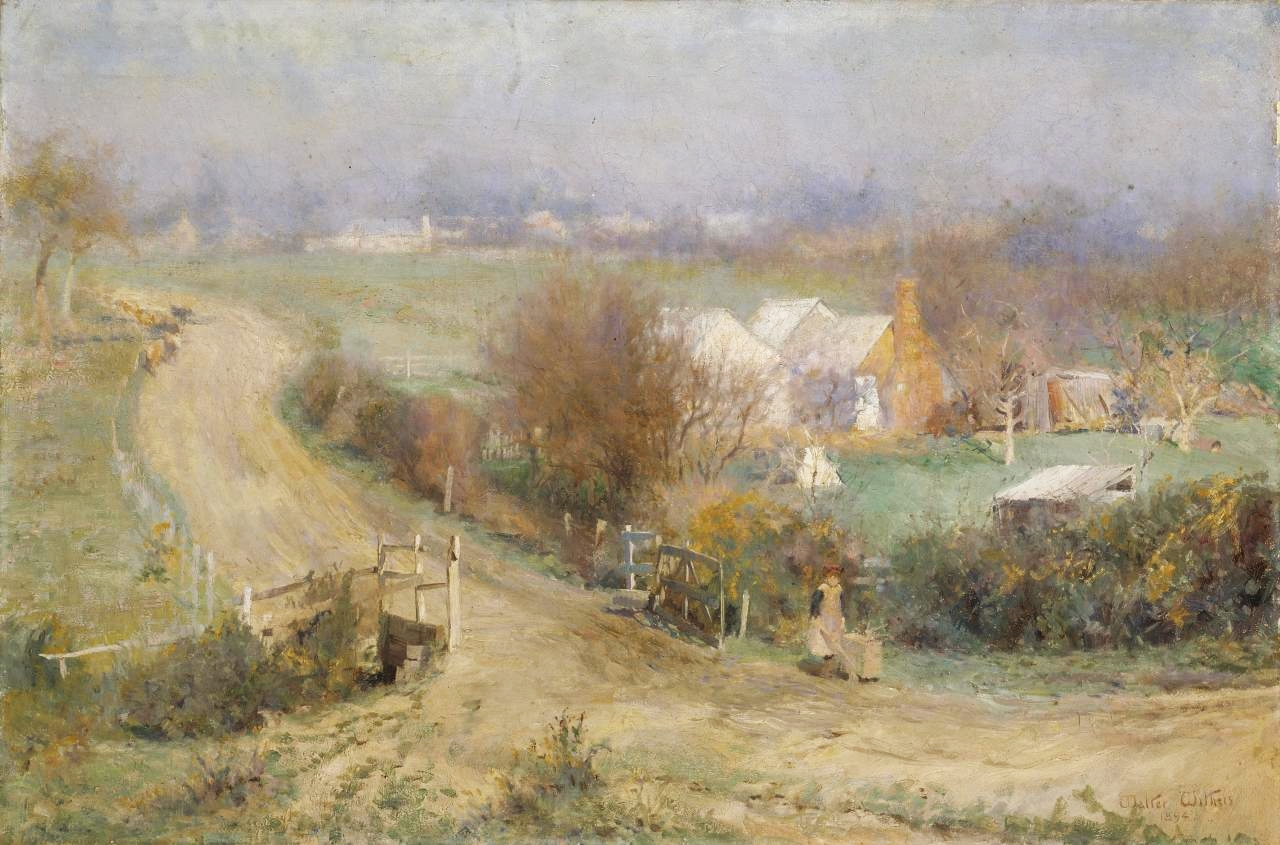
A Bright Winter's Morning, 1894, National Gallery of Victoria

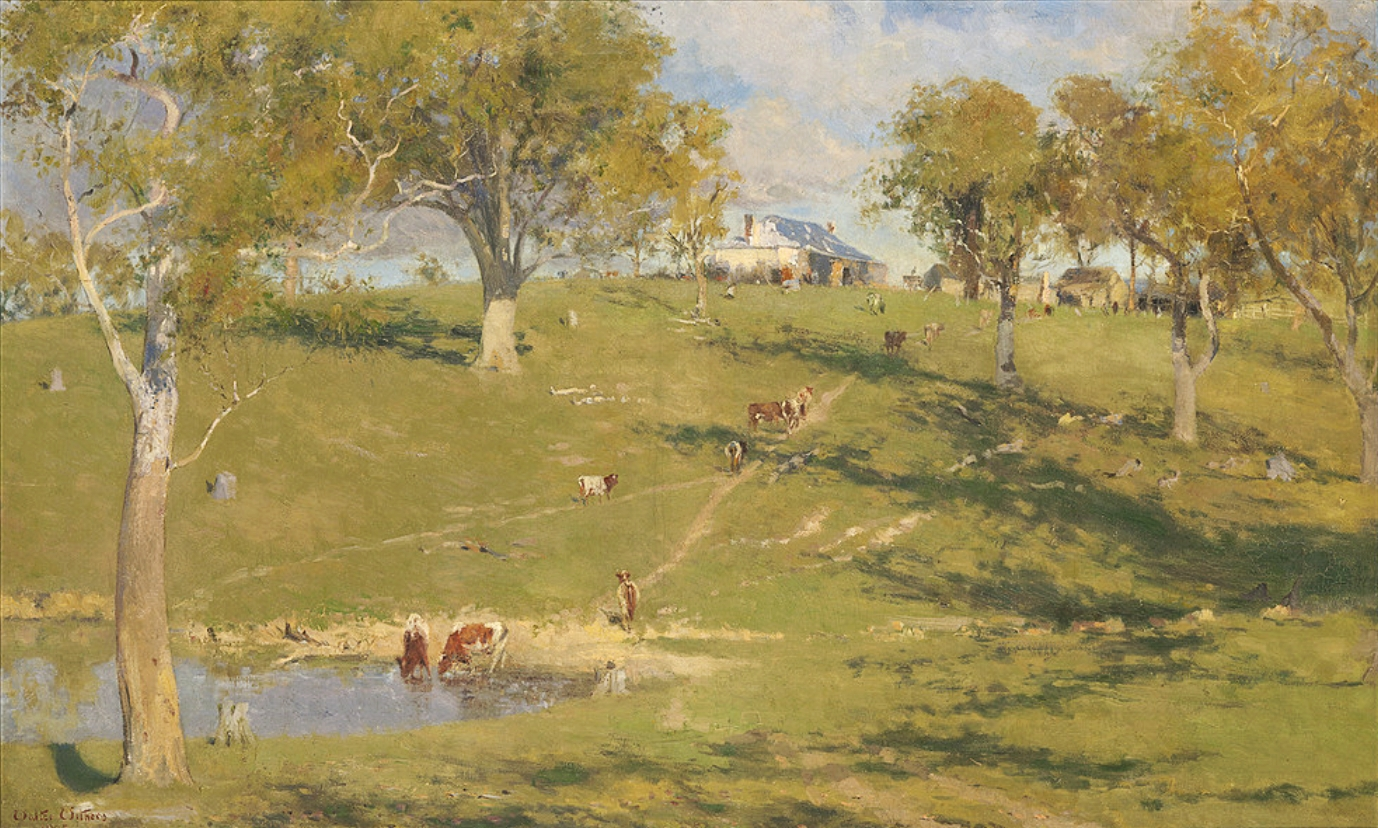
Tranquil Winter, 1895, National Gallery of Victoria

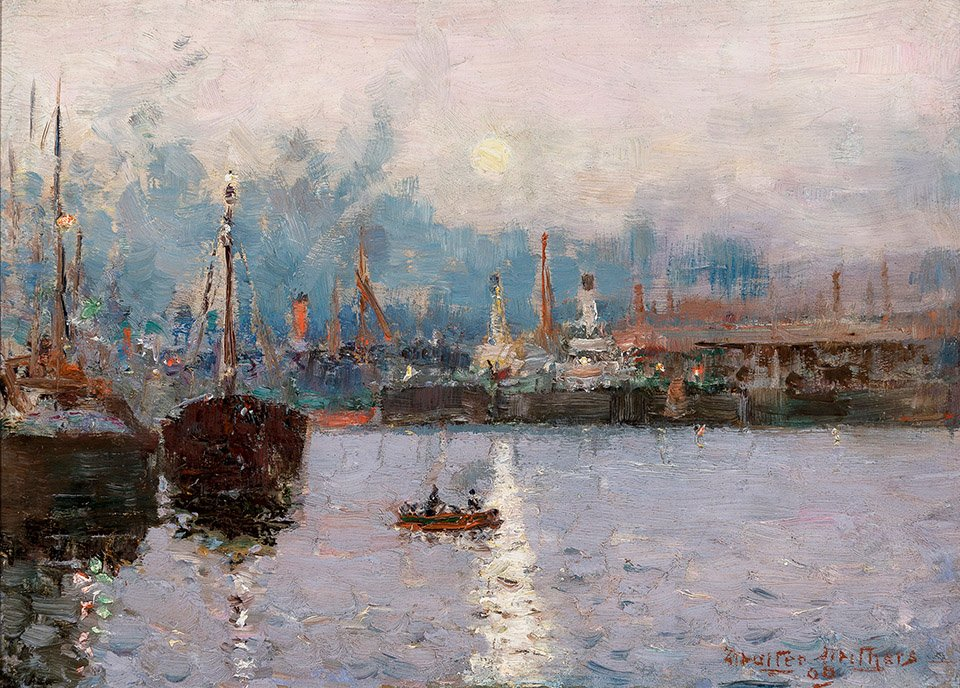
Moonrise on the Yarra, 1908, Geelong Art Gallery

== See also ==
Visual arts of Australia
