= Mother of God Primary School =

Primary school in Ivanhoe East, Victoria

Mother of God

Location
- 66 Wilfred Road, Ivanhoe East, Victoria; Australia; 37.773448°S 145.058631°E

Information
- Type: Primary School
- Motto: Cum Maria (With Mary)
- Religious affiliation: Roman Catholic
- Established: 1963
- Closed: 2017
- Grades: Prep to Year 6
- Gender: Coeducational
- Enrolment: 106 (2016)
- Colours: Maroon; White

Mother of God Primary School (nicknamed "MOG") was a primary school in Ivanhoe East, Victoria. The school opened in 1963 after being converted from an old house. In the schools infancy the Sisters of St. Joseph of the Apparition taught grades prep to grade 3. With extensions to the school in 1964, it allowed grades 4 and 5 to accepted and then grade 6 students later on.

In August 2017, Catholic Education Melbourne confirmed that a review was being undertaken to determine the viability of schools in the Ivanhoe Parish which consisted of three schools, Mary Immaculate School and St Bernadette's School, which are still open and Mother of God. Following the review, the school closed at the end of 2017 with the reasons being "limited enrolment growth" and the need for the Ivanhoe parish to consolidate their resources. In 2016 the school had 106 students enrolled.

The site of the school is now leased as the middle school for years 2 and 3 for the neighbouring Ivanhoe East Primary School.

== History ==
The land was originally owned by Thomas Walker when he purchased the 420-hectare (approx.) parcel of land known as "Portion 2 of the Parish of Keelbundora" in 1838. Walker subdivided the land and sold it as numerous separate land parcels for large profits. The site of the church was bought by George Brunswick Smyth to be a part of his property, the 'Chelsworth Estate', a 215-hectare (approx.) property. The homestead for the estate, built in the 1860s, is now used as the clubhouse for the Ivanhoe Golf Course. By the late 1970s, Smyth had leased most of the property to farmers. In around 1900, the majority of the estate was purchased by Philip Champion de Crespigny and William Lawson Davidson. It was them who were responsible for surveying and establishing a lot of the road network in the area that exists to this day.

The block of land bound by Wallis Avenue, Wilfred Road and Robinhood Road was purchased by Carl Otto Marschner in 1913, who later subdivided and sold the land of the church and 50 Wilfred Road in 1917 to Percival Herbert Austin who then built a dwelling on the double allotment. In 1951, new owners of the land again, subdivided the property into the parcels that exist today and in January 1956, the Roman Catholic Trusts Corporation for the Diocese of Melbourne purchased the site for the constriction of a church. An article in Catholic Weekly newspaper, The Advocate said:

As a result of the meeting held at the home of Mr. Frank Galbally, Withers-street, East Ivanhoe, recently, the forty or so present unanimously decided that a church should be erected in the vicinity to meet the needs of the Catholics of this rapidly growing residential suburb who find that they are too remote from the churches at Heidelberg and Ivanhoe. Plans for the new building are in the course of preparation and as soon as they are finalized (sic.), the church will be commenced. It will be erected at the intersection of Maltravers-street and Ormond-road. Father J. Geoghegan, P.P., Immaculate Conception parish, Ivanhoe, is in charge of the district embraced by the proposed church.

— The Advocate

== Church ==
The Mother of God Church, located across the road from the school at 56 Wilfred Road, Ivanhoe East, was constructed in 1956–57 at the beginning of the boom in post war church construction. The church was designed by the noted architects Mockridge, Stahle and Mitchell, and built by Clements Langford Pty Ltd. The foundation stone was blessed by Archbishop Daniel Mannix on 11 November 1956 in front of a large crowd, and the first mass was celebrated in September 1957 with Mannix in attendance. Later that year in November, the church purchased a site across the road at 63 Wilfred Road to be used as the presbytery. In January 1958, Fr Geoghegan was selected to become the inaugural parish priest.

In 2017 the Parish confirmed that like the school, the church would be closed, and sold, which took place in 2020. On 4 December 2022, roughly 300 parishioners attended the church's final mass.

At the same time, the City of Banyule was pursuing a heritage listing, which was finalised in April 2023. The heritage citation states the church is "of historical significance as the earliest modernist church constructed in the municipality, and the first religious commission by the then young postwar architectural practice of Mockridge, Stahle & Mitchell.", and is "of aesthetic significance as a generally intact, distinctive instance of ‘modern’ church design.". In November 2023 it was put up for sale again. In May 2024 it was purchased by Saints Church Melbourne, a younger congregation who intend on retaining its use as a church for their congregation.
