= Globar =

Light source for infrared spectroscopy

A Globar is used as a thermal light source for infrared spectroscopy. The preferred material for making Globar is silicon carbide that is shaped as rods or arches of various sizes. When inserted into a circuit that provides it with electric current, it emits radiation from ~ 2 to 50 micrometres wavelength via the Joule heating phenomenon. In 1962, a study showed that the emissivity of a SiC Globar between a wavelength of 0.65µm and 14.9µm ranged between 0.70 and 0.84. In 2007, research on the emissivity of Globar used computer modelling to attempt to compensate for the effect of atmospheric water vapour.

Globars are used as infrared sources for spectroscopy because their spectral behavior corresponds approximately to that of a Planck radiator (i.e. a black body). Alternative infrared sources are Nernst lamps, coils of chrome–nickel alloy or high-pressure mercury lamps.

The technical term Globar is an English portmanteau word consisting of glow and bar. The term glowbar is sometimes used synonymously in English (which is an incorrect spelling in the strict sense).

The American Resistor Company in Milwaukee, Wisconsin, had word and lettering Globar registered as a trademark (in a special decorative script font) with the United States Patent and Trademark Office on June 30, 1925 (registration number 0200201) and on October 18, 1927 (registration number 0234147). This registration had been renewed for the third time in 1987 (by various companies throughout 60 years).

== See also ==
- Nernst lamp
- List of light sources
