= Snelleman house =

Heritage-listed house in Melbourne, Victoria, Australia

- Location of the house in Greater Metropolitan Melbourne
- Interactive map of the Snelleman house area
- Alternative names: Coil house; Doughnut house

General information
- Status: Completed
- Type: House
- Architectural style: Modernist
- Location: 40 Keam Street, Ivanhoe East, City of Banyule, Melbourne, Victoria, Australia
- Coordinates: 37°46′06″S 145°04′02″E
- Completed: 1954; 72 years ago
- Cost: A£6,000
- Client: Hans and Pamela Snelleman

Technical details
- Material: Bagged brick; glass; timber

Design and construction
- Architect: Peter McIntyre
- Main contractor: Birt & Dew
- Awards: Architecture and Arts Award (1954)

Victorian Heritage Register
- Official name: Snelleman House
- Type: Registered place
- Designated: 14 July 2011
- Reference no.: H2282
- Heritage overlay no.: HO36
- Category: Residential buildings (private)

The Snelleman house, also known as the Coil house and the doughnut house, is a house located at 40 Keam Street in Ivanhoe East, in the City of Banyule, in the northern suburbs of Melbourne, in Victoria, Australia.

Built in 1954 on the traditional lands of the Wurundjeri people, the house was added to the Victorian Heritage Register on 14 July 2011 in recognition of its architectural significance; and was added to a non-statutory list by the City of Banyule on an unknown date.

== History ==
The Snelleman house is a modernist residence built on a steeply sloping site at Ivanhoe East, a suburb of Melbourne. It was built in 1954 as a family home for Hans Snelleman, who had been born in The Netherlands, and his wife Pamela. They purchased the land in 1952 and after failing to find an appropriate design through The Age Small Homes Service, they were advised by Robin Boyd to contact the young architect Peter McIntyre, who had established his own practice in 1950. The brief was to retain two old gum trees on site and the views over the Yarra Valley. The house was built by Birt & Dew for A£6,000, comparable in price to a conventional suburban house at the time.

The house curved down the slope around the two gums, and immediately drew much critical acclaim, with articles in Architecture and Arts (November 1954), Australian Home Beautiful (January 1956) and the Australian Women's Weekly (February 1957), and has since then been considered to be one of the most outstanding houses of the time. The Snellemans lived in the house until 2010, with the only major change being the conversion in the 1960s of the original carport to a bedroom and ensuite.

== Description ==
The Snelleman house is a flat-roofed split-level modernist house with an elongated narrow plan only one room wide which steps down the sloping site in what has been described as a reverse J-shape, enclosing a large internal space with gardens and a terraced outdoor living area, and one remaining gum tree. The outer facade is of bagged brick, originally painted green but now white, with small window openings punched into it. The main entrance is set into a narrow recessed porch facing the street, and is screened by a white-painted zigzag timber lattice screen. The courtyard wall is of lightweight timber and glass, with the panels originally painted red and yellow, now all white, with sashless plate glass sliding doors and windows. The roof is bitumen with marble chips on top.

Each of the interior spaces is on a separate platform, and these step down the slope with the living room at the top and the entrance hall, dining room, kitchen, two children's bedrooms a bathroom and the original master bedroom below. Instead of a hallway connecting the rooms there is a gallery which runs along the inner wall, enlarging every room and allowing views across the valley. The bar of the J at the high point of the house was originally a carport, and it was converted in the 1960s into a bedroom and ensuite. The house retains its original built-in room dividers, some built-in furniture, and much of the original kitchen and bathroom fitouts, as well some original light fittings.

== See also ==
- Architecture of Melbourne
- List of places on the Victorian Heritage Register in the City of Banyule
