= Barranger =

Barranger is a surname. Notable people with the surname include:

- Charly Barranger, French music producer
- Todd Barranger (born 1968), American golfer

== See also ==
- Barringer
