= Ravenswood (house) =

Heritage-listed house in Melbourne, Victoria, Australia

- Location of the house in Greater Metropolitan Melbourne

General information
- Status: Completed
- Type: Mansion
- Architectural style: Victorian Italianate
- Location: 40 Beauview Parade, Ivanhoe East, City of Banyule, Melbourne, Victoria, Australia
- Coordinates: 37°46′16″S 145°03′19″E
- Year built: 1891–1914
- Completed: 1891; 135 years ago
- Cost: c.£30,000
- Client: Robert William Kennedy
- Owner: Robert Kennedy (1891–c. 1931); Melbourne Ladies' Benevolent Society (1948–c. 1982); Dr David and Margaret Young (since 1988)

Technical details
- Material: Rendered bricks; bluestone; cast iron; timber
- Floor count: 2
- Grounds: 2 ha (4 acres) (1891–1937); 3,149 m^{2} (33,900 sq ft) (as of 2026)

Design and construction
- Architecture firm: Hitchcock & Nicholson (attrib.)

Victorian Heritage Register
- Official name: Ravenswood
- Type: Registered place
- Delisted: 9 October 1974
- Reference no.: H0199
- Heritage overlay no.: HO11
- Category: Residential buildings (private)

Register of the National Estate
- Official name: Ravenswood
- Type: Defunct register
- Designated: 21 March 1978
- Reference no.: 5606

Ravenswood is an Italianate mansion located at 40 Beauview Parade in Ivanhoe East, (Note: Sometimes listed as located in Ivanhoe.) in the City of Banyule, in the northern suburbs of Melbourne, in Victoria, Australia.

Built in stages from 1891, on the traditional lands of the Wurundjeri people, the mansion was added to the Victorian Heritage Register on 9 October 1974 in recognition of its architectural and historical significance; and was also added to the non-statutory and now defunct Register of the National Estate on 21 March 1978; and by the City of Banyule to a non-statutory list on an unknown date.

Between 1951 and 1982, the mansion was used as a nursing home for elderly women; and was subsequently restored as a private residence after 1988.

== History ==
=== Kennedy's ownership ===
Ravenswood at Ivanhoe East was begun in 1891 for financier Robert William Kennedy on two hectares (four acres) rising from the north side of Lower Heidelberg Road. The house and its impressive garden were then surrounded by open farmland. The Heidelberg area was popular for gentlemen’s houses in the 1840s, although later went out of favour. Ravenswood was begun just before the 1890s depression, and was one of the last boom-period mansions built anywhere in Melbourne. The house was built in several stages. The architects for the first stage were probably Hitchcock & Nicholson – although, Twentyman & Askew, or J. Smith may also have been the architect. It is not known whether the same architects designed subsequent additions.

The first stage, comprising the main bulk of the house, was probably begun in 1891, the ballroom was added in 1895, and the rooms above the ballroom in between 1910 and 1914. A ballroom extension of this kind was unusual for this period, and indicates that Kennedy was not affected significantly by the depression. A driveway led across a grand balustraded terrace at the front of the house towards the stables at the rear. During Kenedy's ownership, the mansion was commonly used as a location for various society gatherings, with up to 500 guests.

=== Subsequent ownership and use ===
By 1931, it was reported that Mr and Ms C. T. Anton were owners of Ravenswood; and by late 1937, it was listed for sale with a tennis court and swimming pool. The land was progressively subdivided sometime after 1937 and, during World War II, the mansion was resumed for military use. After the war, the mansion was purchased by The Woollies Appeal for Children's Charities in c. 1945 for proposed use as an emergency nursery. Pending the nursery's establishment, the mansion was converted into four flats. By 1948, it appeared that the nursery may not have eventuated; as Ravenswood was purchased by the Melbourne Ladies' Benevolent Society (MLBS) for use as a nursing home for approximately thirty elderly women, that opened in 1951, after extensive alterations to the former mansion. Additionally, a cream-brick extension was added to the rear of the building in 1956. Many original internal features were also lost in a fire; and around the time of the winding up of the MLBS in 1983, Ravenswood was in a dilapidated condition.

The mansion was sold in 1988 for A$1.3 million; and from 2010 there were reports that the house was restored and owned by Dr David and Margaret Young.

== Description ==
Ravenswood is a two-storey mansion of rendered brick on a bluestone base in an ornate Victorian Italianate, or Renaissance Revival style. There is elaborate stucco decoration typical of the boom period on the exterior, with festoons, cornices, balustrades and parapets. A two-storey arcade loggia, carried on cast iron Corinthian columns, runs across the front south elevation and returns on both sides, past square columns on the corners. There is a decorative pedimented Corinthian entrance porch over the balustraded stairs leading from the terrace up to the verandah.

On the west facade is a polygonal bay rising up two storeys. The ballroom on the east side of the house has arched fanlights, etched glass windows, and an elevated stage; its facade is more plainly rendered than the older facades. There was once a conservatory attached to the side of the ballroom. A second storey was added above the ballroom in 1910–1914, comprising bedrooms arranged around an elegant timber balcony projecting beyond the ballroom. The north side of the house is not rendered, and toothed brickwork suggests that future extensions on this side were planned.

Ravenswood is representative of a way of life now lost and which is strongly associated with the zenith of Victorian Melbourne. Architecturally, the mansion is distinguished by its stuccoed mouldings and detailing. Substantially intact, the house is one of the largest in the City of Banyule.

Remnants of the original garden landscaping and planting survive, initially set on 2 hectares (4 acres), and was subdivided to form the Beauview Estate in the 1930s. Early photographs show a grand Victorian garden, laid out in the gardenesque style, however very little of this layout remains. Two features which can be traced to the original garden are a large Moreton Bay Fig (Ficus macrophylla) immediately on the south of the house and a row of Bhutan Cypress (Cupressus torulosa) to the east. Other significant vegetation on the site includes a large Norfolk Island Hibiscus (Lagunaria patersonia) at the entrance to the driveway, and a Common Oak (Quercus robur) at the property's south east corner. It is most likely these specimens date from the time of subdivision, perhaps earlier. The current driveway and balustraded terrace wall are reconstructions of those seen in early photographs. The low rock wall which surrounds much of the southern frontage of the property was erected by Jennings during the subdivision of the property, and is contemporary with the surrounding estate.

== See also ==
- Architecture of Melbourne
- List of places on the Victorian Heritage Register in the City of Banyule
