= Nernst lamp =

Early form of lamp using an incandescent ceramic rod

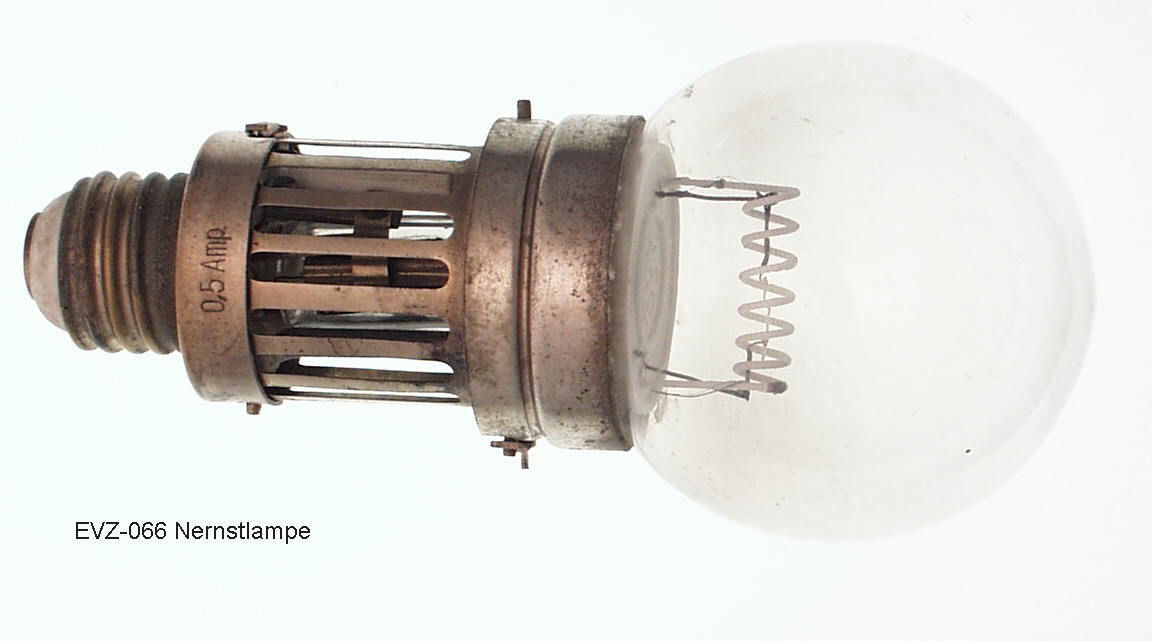
Complete model B Nernst lamp with cloche, 95 volts, 0.5 amperes DC.

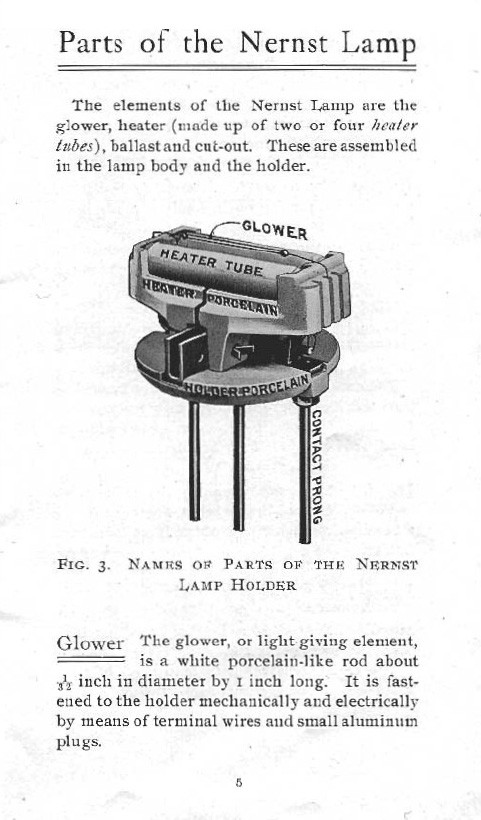
A Nernst lamp diagram from 1903. The light-emitting ceramic filament is called a "glower".

The Nernst lamp is an early form of the incandescent lamp.

== Construction ==
Nernst lamps did not use a glowing tungsten filament. Instead, they used a ceramic rod that was heated to incandescence. Because the rod (unlike tungsten wire) would not further oxidize when exposed to air, there was no need to enclose it within a vacuum or noble gas environment; the burners in Nernst lamps could operate exposed to the air and were only enclosed in glass to isolate the hot incandescent emitter from its environment. A ceramic of zirconium oxide – yttrium oxide was used as the glowing rod.

== Efficiency ==
Developed by the German physicist and chemist Walther Nernst in 1897 at the University of Göttingen, these lamps were about twice as efficient as carbon-filament lamps and emitted a more "natural" light (more similar in spectrum to daylight). The lamps were quite successfully marketed for a time, although they eventually lost out to the more efficient tungsten-filament incandescent light bulb. One disadvantage of the Nernst design was that the ceramic rod was not electrically conductive at room temperature, so the lamps needed a separate heater filament to heat the ceramic sufficiently to begin conducting electricity.

== Manufacturing ==
In the U.S., Nernst sold the patent to George Westinghouse, who founded the Nernst Lamp Company at Pittsburgh in 1901. Minerals for the production of the glowers were extracted from the company's own mines at the legendary Barringer Hill, Texas (since 1937 submerged beneath the waters of Lake Buchanan). By 1904 a total of over 130,000 Nernst lamps had been placed in service throughout the country.

In Europe, the lamps were produced by the German Allgemeine Elektrizitäts-Gesellschaft (AEG, General Electricity Company) at Berlin. At the 1900 World's Fair held in Paris, the pavilion of the AEG was illuminated by 800 Nernst lamps, which was said to be quite spectacular at the time.

== Scientific use ==
In addition to their usage for ordinary electric illumination, Nernst lamps were used in one of the first practical long-distance photoelectric facsimile (fax) systems, designed by professor Arthur Korn in 1902, and in Allvar Gullstrand's original slit lamp (1911) which is used for ophthalmology to allow physicians to view the inside of a patient's eye and contributed to Gullstrand's Nobel Prize award.

Even after Nernst lamps became obsolete as visible light lamps, "Nernst glowers" continue to be used as the infrared-emitting source used in IR spectroscopy devices. Their emission of infrared makes them inefficient as visible light sources, but perfect for IR spectroscopy applications. Silicon carbide Globars now compete for this purpose as they are conductive even at room temperature and therefore need no preheating.

== See also ==
- List of light sources
