= Barringer Hill =

Barringer Hill is a drowned geological and mineralogical site in central Texas. It lies on the former west side of the Colorado River, beneath Lake Buchanan, about 22 miles (35 km) northeast of the town of Llano. It consists of a pegmatite, lies near the eastern edge of the Central Mineral Region in the Texas Hill Country and is named for John Baringer, who discovered here much gadolinite about 1887.

== Geology and history ==
The Barringer (Baringer) pegmatite was discovered in 1887 and, until its disappearance beneath the water of Lake Buchanan in 1937, was one of the most significant places in America from a mineralogical standpoint. Described by the United States Geological Survey as one of the greatest deposits of rare-earth minerals in the world, the pegmatite was the first place geologists discovered fergusonite, thorogummite, and nivenite.

The pegmatite is centrally located in the Lone Grove pluton, a 1.6 Ga old rapakivi granite, intruded into Valley Spring Gneiss. Geologic evidence suggests the pluton's emplacement as a rather shallow intrusion of magma, possibly in a sub-caldera type situation. An original depth of five to seven kilometers may be assumed for the present level of exposure (Denney).

Prior to mining, the hill was described as 40 feet (12 m) tall by about 100 feet (30 m) wide and 250 feet (76 m) long. Hess describes the intrusion being surrounded by a graphic granite of peculiar beauty and definite structure, being more like a text-book illustration.

A central quartz mass was described more than 40 ft (12 m) across, with distinct white bands, from one-eighth to one-half inch wide. Within the white bands were found fluid inclusions and bubbles that moved only slowly when the specimen was tilted. Between these bands the quartz is glassy and clear. At one place a vug was found large enough for a man to enter, lined with smoky quartz crystals reaching 1,000 pounds (450 kg) or more in weight. A large crystal of smoky quartz was removed that weighed over six hundred pounds (270 kg). It was 43 inches (1,100 mm) high and 28 inches (710 mm) broad and 15 inches (380 mm) thick (1090 by 710 by 380 mm).

The feldspar consisted of an intergrowth of microcline and albite, of a brownish flesh color, and occurred in large masses reaching over 30 feet (9.1 m) in diameter (Hess).

William E. Hidden next to a 73 lb (33 kg) mass of gadolinite in place at Barringer Hill, 1903.

Of the 47 minerals discovered at Barringer Hill, gadolinite, a radioactive form of yttria, triggered the most interest at the time. This greenish-black ore had previously only been found in small amounts in Russia and Norway.

Because of its economic potential as a material for light filaments, both Thomas Edison and George Westinghouse attempted to obtain the hill, with the Piedmont Mining Company, which was owned by Edison, winning out in 1889.

In 1903, German chemist Walther Nernst, who later became famous for discovering the Third Law of Thermodynamics, was working for Westinghouse when he developed a street light that used raw gadolinite as a filament.

The mineral species rich in yttrium-erbium were more particularly sought after because thorium and uranium were not used in the "glower" of the Nernst lamp. The Nernst Lamp Company, a subsidy of Westinghouse, then bought Barringer Hill and began mining, extracting a few hundred pounds of yttria minerals annually for a few years.

Eventually, Nernst Lamp Company ceased operations as newer technologies surpassed the lamp. The seventy-three pound group of crystals (of gadolinite), found in March 1903, was the greatest "find" of record in this mineral; but just one year later, a mass of roughly crystallized gadolinite was found, partly imbedded in the bed-rock at the northeast corner of the hill, that measured thirty-six inches long, eleven inches (280 mm) thick at the widest part, and weighed a little over two hundred pounds. It was apparently free from alteration, had specific gravity of 4.28 (taken on a very pure fragment), had a bright green chatoyancy at certain angles, and was like glass in its broad obsidian-like conchoidal fracture.

73 pound (33 kg) double crystal of gadolinite.

Masses of coarsely crystallized fluorite up to four hundred pounds (180 kg) weight were not rare, and some of these had very large faces of the cube and rhombic dodecahedron. Its color varied from dark green to puce and purple, and colorless transparent rough crystals having remarkably perfect cleavage were sometimes observed.

Some of the fluorite was true chlorophane and exhibited a brilliant green light when strongly heated and viewed in the dark. One mass was self-luminous, at night, without heating it. Enormous crystals of orthoclase were common, some over five feet in diameter.

Quite frequently, small veins of very perfect red feldspar crystals (highly twinned), and upon which albite crystals were attached, were found bordering the fluorite and penetrating it. In the feldspar, well crystallized menaccanite was sometimes observed.

Yellow rutile, of the sagenitic variety, was observed in only one instance and then upon smoky quartz crystals. Polycrase, or an allied species, was seen implanted upon the gadolinite. Very fair amethysts were found in the west end of the hill, in cavities in the feldspar. Masses of biotite, four feet across, were met with and always indicated the presence near-by of the rare-earth minerals.

Of particular note were the unusually long radial lines projecting in many directions from the bodies of ore richest in thorium, uranium and zirconium. Hidden named these occurrences "stars" and eagerly sought for them as positive "pointers" to ore. At one point he noted a redness of skin and burning sensation when mining these, that he attributed to radioactivity, which was poorly understood at the time.

Barringer Hill now lies under the waters of the manmade Lake Buchanan, which was filled in starting in May 1937.

== Music ==
The song "Ragged Wood" by the band Fleet Foxes references the site: "Lie to me if you will / at the top of Barringer Hill."
