= Herbert Page Barringer =

Australian watercolour artist (1886–1946)

Herbert Page Barringer (1886 – 12 August 1946) was an Australian watercolour artist.

== Biography ==
Barringer was born in North Adelaide on 22 November 1886, the child of Leonard Barringer and his wife Fanny (née Page). His older sister, Ethel Barringer, was another painter. He married Gwendoline L'Avence Adamson, also a watercolourist, in North Adelaide on 18 Nov 1910. They divorced in 1937.

Barringer painted Australian landscapes and was active in the 1920s and 1930s.

He died in South Australia on 12 August 1946 and a memorial exhibition of his work was held in Adelaide later that year.

== Gallery ==
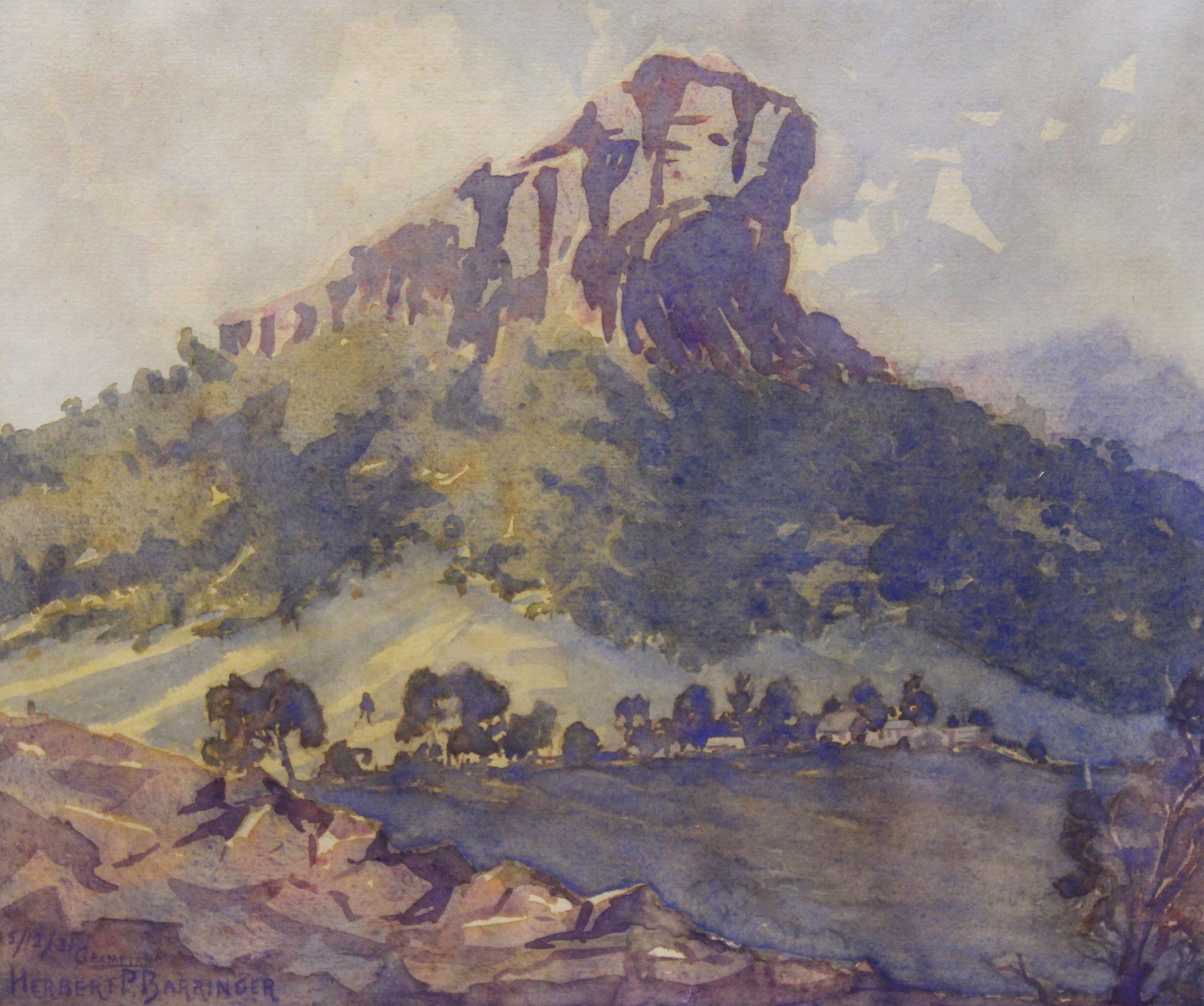
Grampians (1931)
