= Ethel Barringer =

Australian artist (1883–1925)

- Born: 24 July 1883; Adelaide, Australia
- Died: 30 May 1925 (aged 41); Blackwood, South Australia
- Known for: Etching

Ethel Barringer (24 July 1883 – 30 May 1925) was a South Australian artist who excelled in various media, but was particularly known for her etchings.

Ethel was a daughter of Leonard Barringer (c. 1844 – 11 August 1895) and his wife Fanny, née Page (c. 1857 – 6 July 1920). She was educated at the Advanced School for Girls under Miss Rees George, and was a student of Hans Heysen and Mary Packer Harris at the SA School of Arts and Crafts. She studied in London for several years and took courses in enamelling, jewellery designing, life work, and etching at the St John's Wood Art School and the Sir John Cass Technical School. On her return to Adelaide she set up a studio of her own in Flinders Street, but gave it up when she gained an appointment as assistant teacher at the School of Arts and Crafts on North Terrace.

She died suddenly of a heart attack in Blackwood where she had been teaching for four years and was popular with both fellow-teachers and students. Her death came as a shock to members of the staff, who had been with her on the Saturday morning, when she was in excellent spirits, having just been congratulated on her work at an exhibition of the Women Painter-Etchers Society in Sydney.

Select works

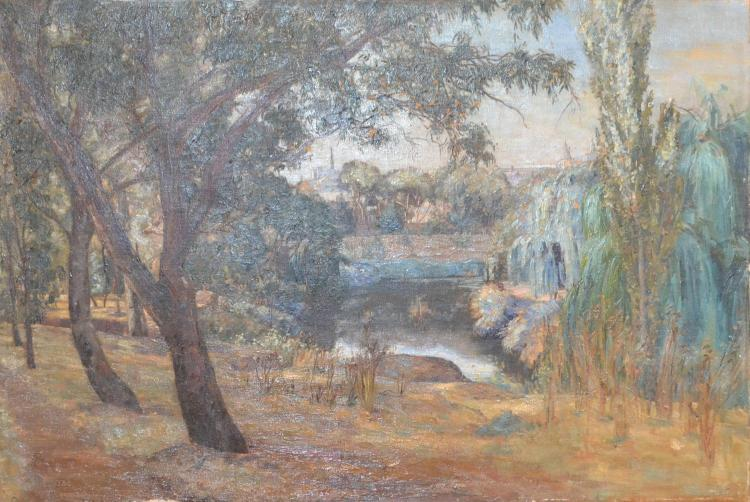
Landscape, Oil on Canvas

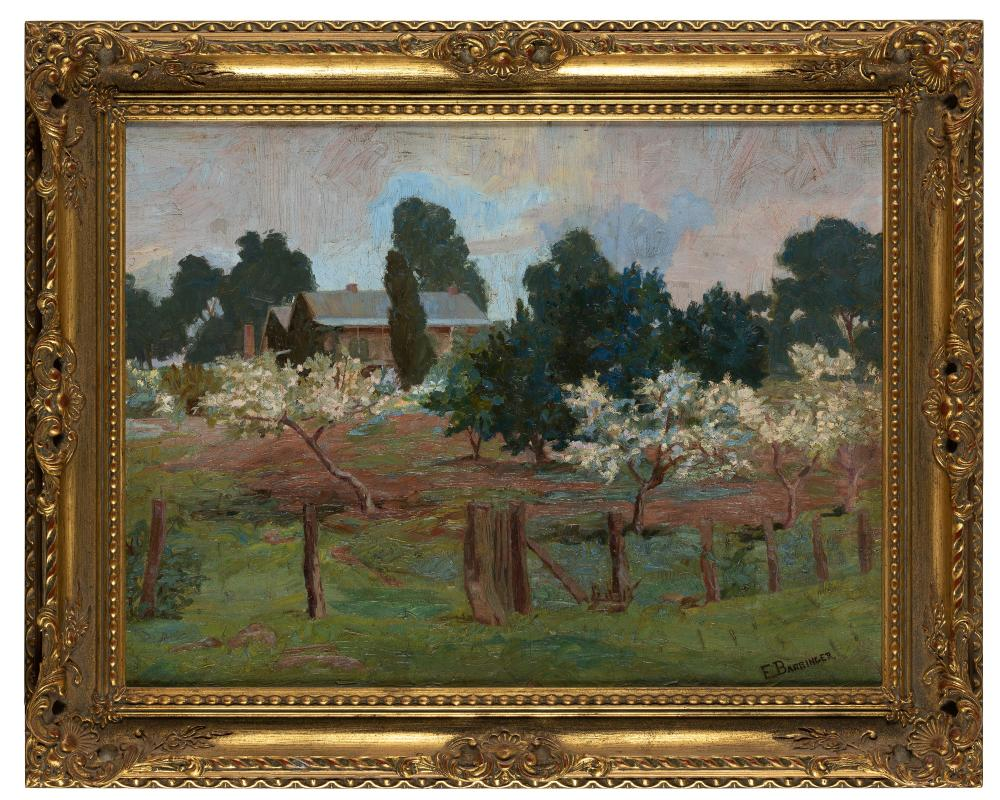
The Orchard

== Family ==
Ethel's brother Herbert Page Barringer (1886–1946) married Gwendoline L'Avance Adamson, who as Gwen Barringer (1882–1960) was a notable artist. They married on 18 November 1910; she later divorced him on grounds of cruelty.

== Recognition ==
The Ethel Barringer Memorial Prize for etching was named for her. Barringer Street in the Canberra suburb of Conder is named in her honour, as well as her sister-in-law Gwen.
