= Barringer Hotel =

- U.S. National Register of Historic Places
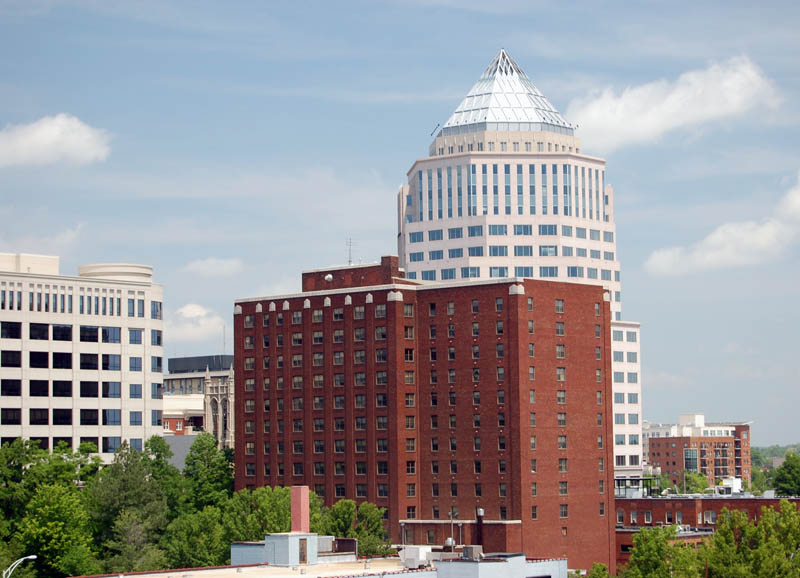
- Barringer Hotel, May 2008

- Location within North Carolina Location within the United States
- Location: 426 N. Tryon St., Charlotte, North Carolina
- Coordinates: 35°13′48″N 80°50′19″W
- Area: 2.2 acres (0.89 ha)
- Built: 1940, 1950
- Built by: Jno. C. Heslep Company
- Architect: Dial, Bobbie, and Thomas, Albert
- Architectural style: Art Deco
- NRHP reference No.: 11000637
- Added to NRHP: August 29, 2011

Barringer Hotel, also known as Hall House, was a historic hotel building located at Charlotte, Mecklenburg County, North Carolina. The 12-story, red brick building consisted of the main block constructed in 1940 and five-bay-deep rear addition in 1950. The tall first level of the façade featured Art Deco-style decoration including a cast-concrete frontispiece with a low-relief stepped parallel lines and terminated at the top into a zig-zag pattern. The City of Charlotte renovated the structure in 1983 to apartments for elderly, low-income residents.

It was added to the National Register of Historic Places in 2013.

It was demolished on November 6, 2022.
