= Gwen Barringer =

Australian artist (1882–1960)

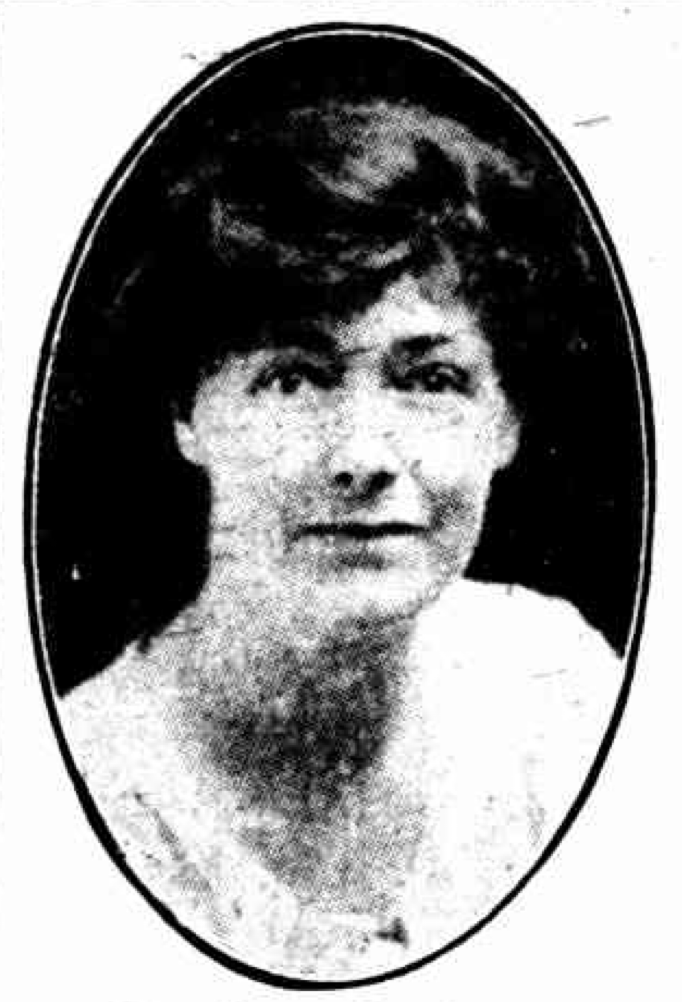
- Born: 29 July 1882; Adelaide
- Died: 26 August 1960; Adelaide
- Occupations: Painter, watercolorist
- Spouse: Herbert Page Barringer

Gwen Barringer (29 July 1882 – 26 August 1960) was a South Australian artist, known for her watercolours.

Barringer was noted for watercolours of flowers and landscapes to which she invested a fairyland-like glamour and remained immune to trends and changing fashions. In 1928 following an extensive sketching tour of Europe she held a solo exhibition in Adelaide which achieved a near record sale (over £1000) for an Australian woman. She died in Adelaide on 26 August 1960 after a long illness. She is represented in the State galleries of South Australia and Victoria, and the National Gallery, Canberra.

Barringer studied at the South Australian School of Arts and Crafts under H. P. Gill, Archibald Collins and Hans Heysen. She was a council member of the South Australian Society of Arts for over 30 years, its first female office bearer, and served as Vice President in 1938. She was also well known as an art teacher. She held at least two solo exhibitions in Adelaide before World War I. She visited Paris in 1926 and painted cityscapes in Sydney in the early 1930s.

Barringer Street in the Canberra suburb of Conder is named in her honour, as well as her sister-in-law Ethel.

== Family ==
Barringer was born Gwendoline L'Avence Adamson, her parents being Adam and Kate Emma Adamson (née Kentish, 1861 – 27 December 1941) in the inner Adelaide suburb of Harrowville, Adelaide. Her grandfather was a brother of James Hazel Adamson (1829–1902), a prominent artist of early South Australia.

She married Herbert Page Barringer (also a watercolourist) on 18 November 1910 at Christ Church, North Adelaide, unsuccessfully seeking a divorce in 1930 and later divorcing him in 1937.

Herbert Barringer's sister Ethel Barringer was an artist of some note.

Gwen Barringer died in Adelaide after a long illness, bequeathing funds to establish three prizes for flower painting in watercolour.

== Selected works ==
- Port Adelaide (ca. 1920) Carrick Hill collection.
- at least 28 works held by Art Gallery of South Australia
- House and trees (ca. 1930) National Gallery of Australia
- Mountain and lake (1930s) National Gallery of Australia
- Shirley poppies at National Gallery of Victoria
- Yarra River landscape at National Gallery of Victoria
- Hydrangeas at National Gallery of Victoria

== Exhibitions ==
- 2000 Modern Australian Women: paintings and prints 1925-1945 at Art Gallery of South Australia (then on national tour)
- 1995 Women and Art at Mary Place Gallery, Paddington NSW
- 1994 SA Women Artist: paintings from the 1890s to the 1940s at Art Gallery of South Australia
- 1953 Herald outdoor art show 1953 at Treasury Gardens, Melbourne
- 1931 Society of Women Painters (NSW) Annual exhibition at Education Department's Art Gallery, Sydney NSW
