= Ivanhoe East =

- Suburb
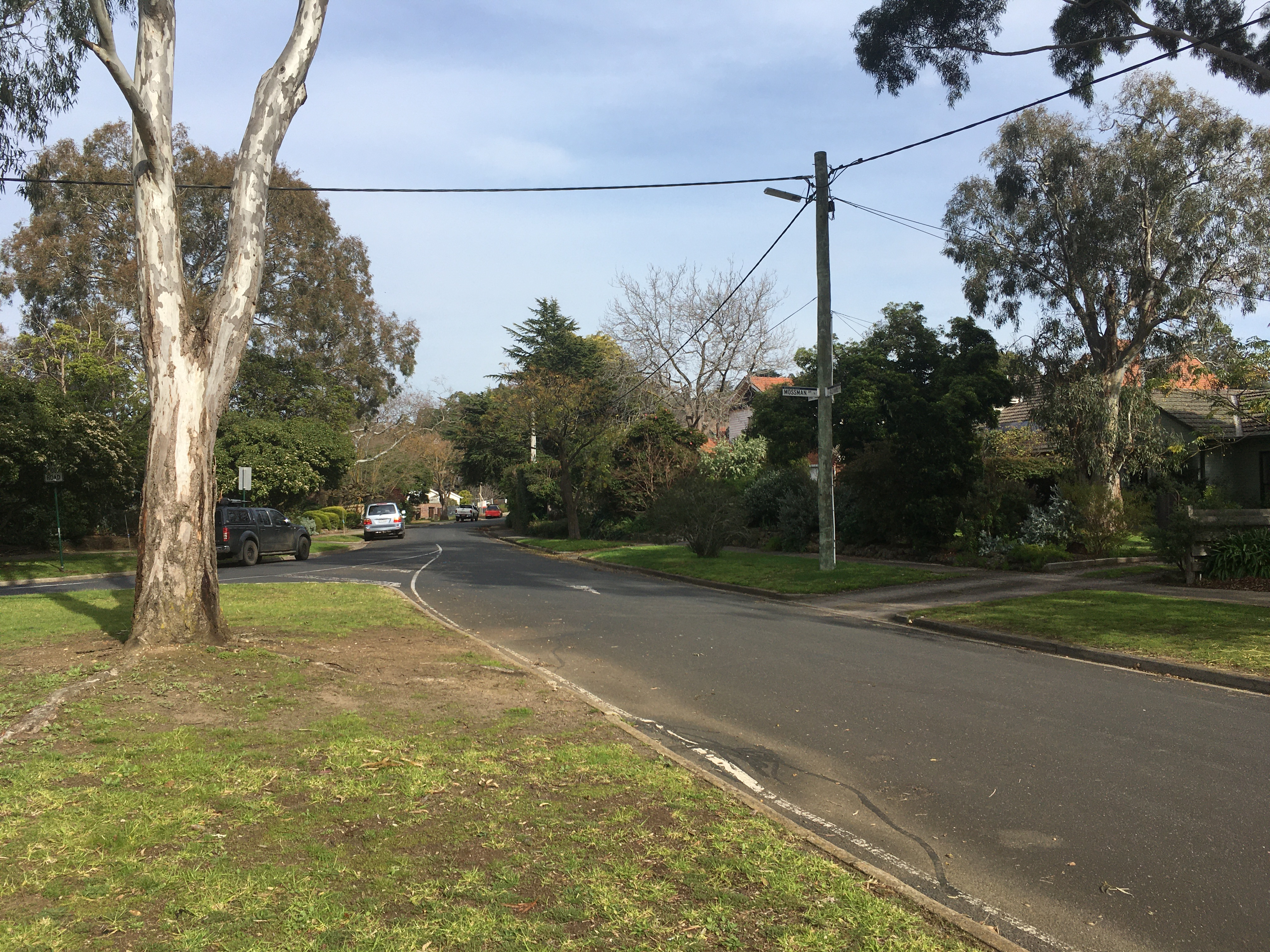
- Glenard Drive, Ivanhoe East

- Interactive map of Ivanhoe East
- Coordinates: 37.772°S 145.066°E
- Country: Australia
- State: Victoria
- City: Melbourne
- LGA: City of Banyule
- Location: 10 km (6.2 mi) from Melbourne

Government
  - State electorate: Ivanhoe
  - Federal division: Jagajaga

Area
  - Total: 2.2 km^{2} (0.85 sq mi)
- Elevation: 42 m (138 ft)

Population
  - Total: 3,762 (2021 census)
  - Density: 1,710/km^{2} (4,430/sq mi)
- Postcode: 3079
Suburbs around Ivanhoe East
Ivanhoe	Eaglemont	Bulleen
Ivanhoe	Ivanhoe East	Bulleen
Kew East	Balwyn North	Balwyn North

Ivanhoe East is a suburb of Melbourne, Victoria, Australia, 10 km north-east from Melbourne's Central Business District, located within the City of Banyule local government area. Ivanhoe East recorded a population of 3,762 at the 2021 census.

In the 12-month period to July 2025, Ivanhoe East reported a median house price of A$2.38 million for a house.

== History ==
The Charterisville homestead, located in neighbouring Ivanhoe, was built in c. 1840, of sandstone quarried on the site, for David Charteris McArthur, Melbourne's first bank manager. Following his death in 1887 part of the house was leased to artist Walter Withers and subsequently Charterisville became an important centre and artists' colony within the Heidelberg School. The Ivanhoe East Post Office opened on 1 November 1939.

=== Heritage listings ===
The following places in Ivanhoe East are listed on the Victorian Heritage Register:

- Ravenswood, 40 Beauview Parade, an Italianate mansion built from 1891
- Snelleman house, also known as coil or doughnut house, 40 Keam Street

== Today ==
Lower Heidelberg Road is considered to be the suburb's centre, which hosts a strip of retail stores. Although only a small area, Ivanhoe East has its own church, newsagent, fruit store, butcher, milk bar, supermarket, bakery and community bank. It also boasts a range of speciality stores.

According to a 2010 analysis by property research company, R.P. Data, Ivanhoe East is the most tightly held residential housing market in Australia, with residents holding on to their properties for an average of 16 years, compared with overall greater Melbourne and Sydney hold periods of 9.6 years and 8 years respectively. Over that 16-year period between May 1994 and May 2010 median house prices within Ivanhoe East have increased from A$250,000 to A$1.25 million, representing an annual average growth rate of approximately 10.6%. As at December 2010 the median house price in Ivanhoe East (for the 12 months to November 2010) was approximately A$1.4 million.

In a separate article The Age notes that "there is no shortage of trees and parkland in Ivanhoe with large blocks, waterways and hilly vistas as trademarks of the area. Yet even with all its green charm, the suburb is just a 15-minute drive from the CBD and is classed as zone 1 for train travel". The Ivanhoe East area "blending into Eaglemont" is specifically described as "the area's more exclusive pocket" with "its own dedicated shopping village, which is much quieter than the strip shopping on Upper Heidelberg Road in Ivanhoe central".

Well regarded residential streets within the Ivanhoe East area include; The Boulevard and surrounding tree-lined streets such as Wallis Avenue, Wilfred Rd, Otterington Grove, Hardy Terrace; Keam and Streeton on the Yarra River side, as well as properties within the Beauview Estate Heritage Overlay Precinct such as York, King and Beauview Parade.

Public library service is provided by Yarra Plenty Regional Library. The nearest library is in Ivanhoe.

=== Education ===
One primary school is located in the Ivanhoe East area: Ivanhoe East Primary School, a public school, located on Warncliffe Road, and backing onto Robin Hood Rd, just south of Lower Heidelberg Road. It comprises the main school as well as a middle school for years 2 and 3 on the site of the former Mother of God Primary School, which closed in 2017.

=== Religion ===
- Roman Catholic Church. The parish of Ivanhoe covers the district along with the neighbouring districts of Ivanhoe and Heidelberg. There are three churches in the parish: the Church of Mary, Mother of God at Robin Hood Road, Ivanhoe East; the Church of Mary Immaculate, Waverley Avenue, Ivanhoe; the Church of St Bernadette, 89 Bond Street, Ivanhoe West.
- Anglican Church. The parish church of St George is located at Warncliffe Road.

== Notable locals ==
- Wilbur Wilde

== See also ==
- City of Heidelberg – Ivanhoe East was previously within this former local government area.
