= Timeline of lighting technology =

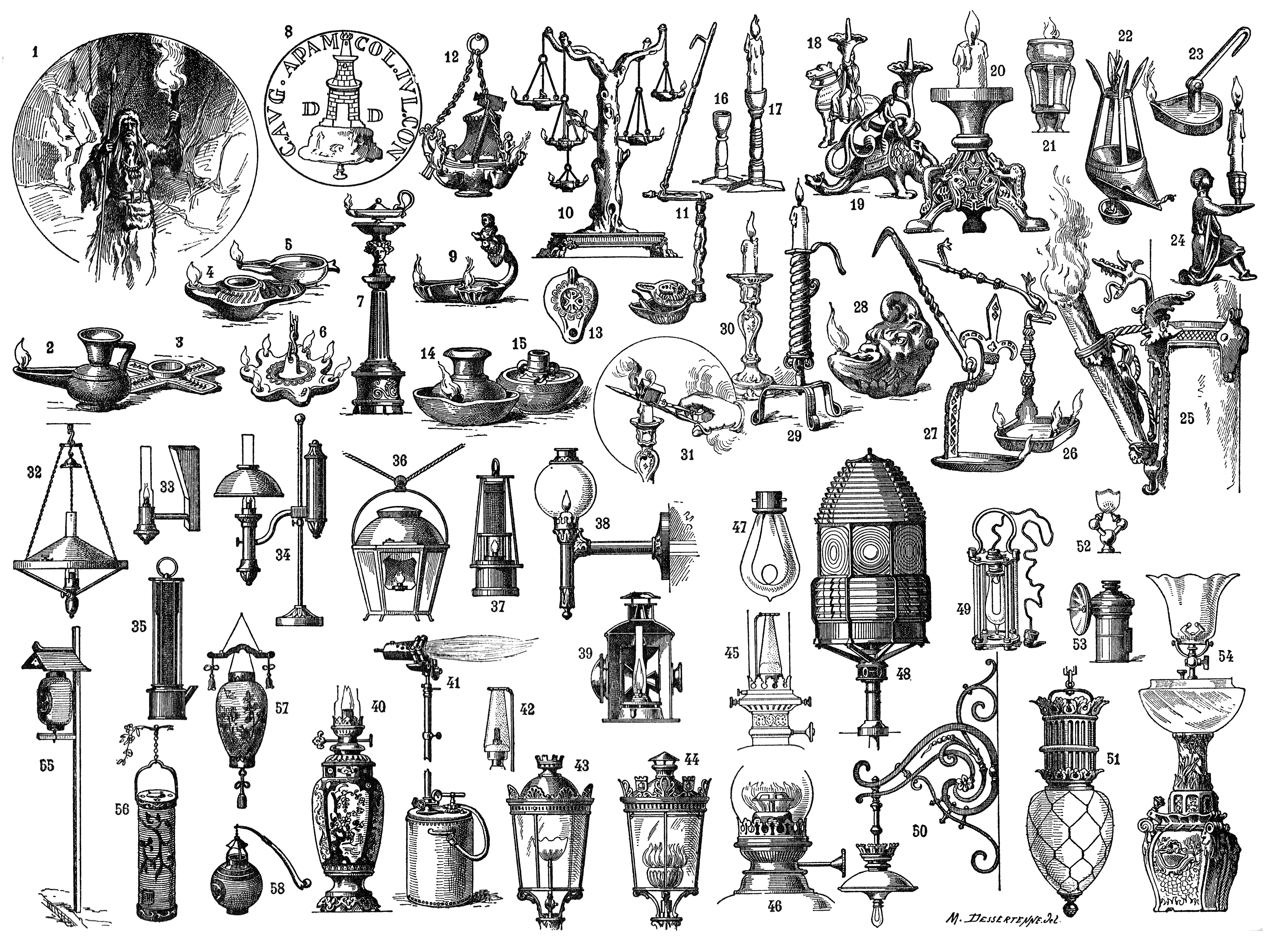
Lighting through the ages (legend)

The price of lighting through the ages

Artificial lighting technology began to be developed tens of thousands of years ago and continues to be refined in the present day.

== Antiquity ==
- 125,000 BC – Widespread control of fire by early humans.
- 17,500 BC – Oldest documented lamp, utilizing animal fat as fuel
- c. 4500 BC – Oil lamps
- c. 3000 BC – Candles are invented.
- 577 CE – Use of matches in China.

== 18th century ==
- 1780 – Ami Argand invents the central draught fixed oil lamp.
- 1784 – Argand designs a central draught lamp with a glass chimney.
- 1792 – William Murdoch begins experimenting with gas lighting and produces the first gas light.
- 1800 – French watchmaker Bertrand Guillaume Carcel overcomes the disadvantages of the Argand-type lamps with his clockwork-fed Carcel lamp.

== 19th century ==
- 1802 – Vasily Vladimirovich Petrov developed the first persistent electric arc.
- 1802 – William Murdoch illuminates the exterior of the Soho Foundry with gas.
- 1805 – Philips and Lee's Cotton Mill, Manchester was the first industrial factory to be fully lit by gas.
- 1807 – Humphry Davy invents the arc lamp when using Voltaic piles (battery) for his electrolysis experiments.
- 1809 – Humphry Davy publicly demonstrates the first electric lamp over 10,000 lumens, at the Royal Society.
- 1813 – Frederick Albert Winsor establishes the National Heat and Light Company.
- 1815 – Humphry Davy invents the miner's safety lamp.
- 1823 – Johann Wolfgang Döbereiner invents the Döbereiner's lamp.
- 1835 – James Bowman Lindsay demonstrates a light bulb based electric lighting system to the citizens of Dundee.
- 1841 Arc-lighting is used as experimental public lighting in Paris.
- 1853 – Ignacy Łukasiewicz invents the modern kerosene lamp.
- 1856 – glassblower Heinrich Geissler confines the electric arc in a Geissler tube.
- 1867 – Edmond Becquerel demonstrates the first fluorescent lamp.
- 1874 – Alexander Lodygin patents an incandescent light bulb.
- 1875 – Henry Woodward patents an electric light bulb.
- 1876 – Pavel Yablochkov invents the Yablochkov candle, the first practical carbon arc lamp, for public street lighting in Paris.
- 1879 (About Christmas time) – Col. R. E. Crompton illuminated his home in Porchester Gardens, using a primary battery of Grove Cells, then a generator which was better. He gave special parties and illuminated his drawing room and dining room. Source: Practical Electrical Engineering, Newnes. Article entitled "The Development of Electric Lighting".
- 1879 – Thomas Edison and Joseph Swan patent the carbon-thread incandescent lamp. It lasted 40 hours.
- 1880 – Edison produced a 16-watt lightbulb that lasted 1,500 hours.
- 1882 – Introduction of large-scale direct current based indoor incandescent lighting and lighting utility with Edison's first Pearl Street Station.
- c. 1885 – Incandescent gas mantle invented, revolutionises gas lighting.
- 1886 – Great Barrington, Massachusetts demonstration project, a much more versatile (long-distance transmission) transformer based alternating current based indoor incandescent lighting system introduced by William Stanley, Jr. working for George Westinghouse. Stanley lit 23 businesses along a 4,000-foot length of main street stepping a 500 AC volt current at the street down to 100 volts to power incandescent lamps at each location.
- 1893 – General Electric introduces the first commercial fully enclosed carbon arc lamp. Sealed in glass globes, it lasts 100 hours and therefore 10 times longer than hitherto carbon arc lamps.
- 1893 – Nikola Tesla puts forward his ideas on high frequency and wireless electric lighting which included public demonstrations where he lit a Geissler tube wirelessly.
- 1894 – Daniel McFarlan Moore creates the Moore tube, precursor of electric gas-discharge lamps.
- 1897 – Walther Nernst invents and patents his incandescent lamp, based on solid state electrolytes.

== 20th century ==
- 1900 – Frederick Baldwin patents a carbide lamp for use on bicycles. The invention builds on acetylene lamps from the 1890s.
- 1901 – Peter Cooper Hewitt creates the first commercial mercury-vapor lamp.
- 1904 – Alexander Just and Franjo Hanaman invent the tungsten filament for incandescent lightbulbs.
- 1910 – Georges Claude demonstrates neon lighting at the Paris Motor Show.
- 1912 – Charles P. Steinmetz invents the metal-halide lamp.
- 1913 – Irving Langmuir discovers that inert gas could double the luminous efficacy of incandescent lightbulbs.
- 1917 – Burnie Lee Benbow patents the coiled coil filament.
- 1920 – Arthur Compton invents the sodium-vapor lamp.
- 1921 – Junichi Miura creates the first incandescent lightbulb to utilize a coiled coil filament.
- 1925 – Marvin Pipkin invents the first internal frosted lightbulb.
- 1926 – Edmund Germer patents the modern fluorescent lamp.
- 1927 – Oleg Losev creates the first LED (light-emitting diode).
- 1953 – Elmer Fridrich invents the halogen lamp.
- 1953 – André Bernanose and several colleagues observe electroluminescence in organic materials.
- 1960 – Theodore H. Maiman creates the first laser.
- 1962 – Nick Holonyak Jr. develops the first practical visible-spectrum (red) light-emitting diode.
- 1963 – Kurt Schmidt invents the first high pressure sodium-vapor lamp.
- 1972 – M. George Craford invents the first yellow light-emitting diode.
- 1972 – Herbert Paul Maruska and Jacques Pankove create the first violet light-emitting diode.
- 1981 – Philips sells their first Compact Fluorescent Energy Saving Lamps, with integrated conventional ballast.
- 1981 – Thorn Lighting Group exhibits the ceramic metal-halide lamp.
- 1985 – Osram answers with the first electronic Energy Saving Lamps to be very successful.
- 1987 – Ching Wan Tang and Steven Van Slyke at Eastman Kodak create the first practical organic light-emitting diode (OLED).
- 1990 – Michael Ury, Charles Wood, and several colleagues develop the sulfur lamp.
- 1991 – Philips invents a fluorescent lightbulb that lasts 60,000 hours using magnetic induction.
- 1994 – T5 lamps with cool tips are introduced to become the leading fluorescent lamps with up to 117 lm/W with good color rendering. These and almost all new fluorescent lamps are to be operated on electronic ballasts only.
- 1994 – The first commercial sulfur lamp is sold by Fusion Lighting.
- 1995 – Shuji Nakamura at Nichia labs invents the first practical blue and with additional phosphor, white LED, starting an LED boom.

== 21st century ==
- 2008 – Ushio Lighting demonstrates the first LED filament.
- 2011 – Philips wins L Prize for LED screw-in lamp equivalent to 60 W incandescent A-lamp for general use.
