= A-series light bulb =

Common light bulb shape

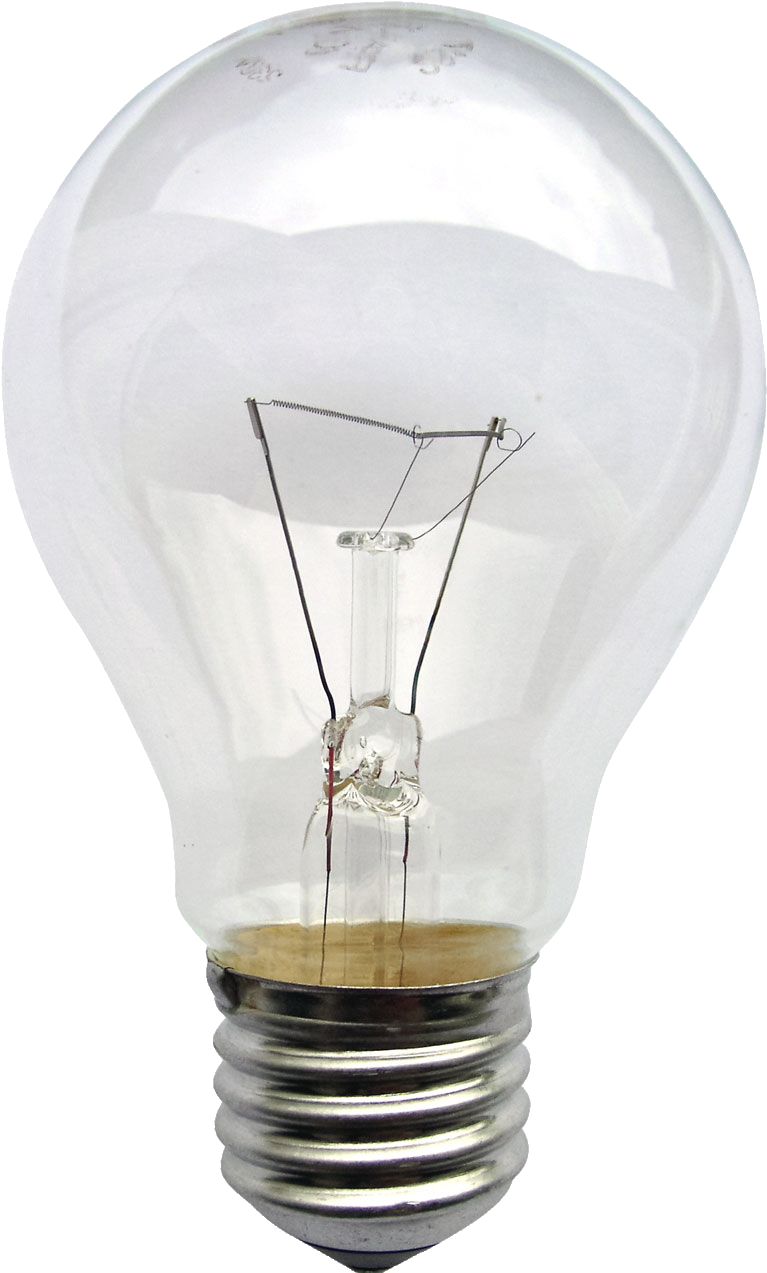
An A-series light bulb

The A-series light bulb is the "classic" glass light bulb shape that has been the most commonly used type for general lighting service (GLS) applications since the early 20th century. It has a pear-like shape and is typically fitted to either an Edison screw or a bayonet cap base. The number that follows the "A" designation indicates the nominal major diameter of the bulb, either in one-eighth inch units in North America or in millimeters in the rest of the world.

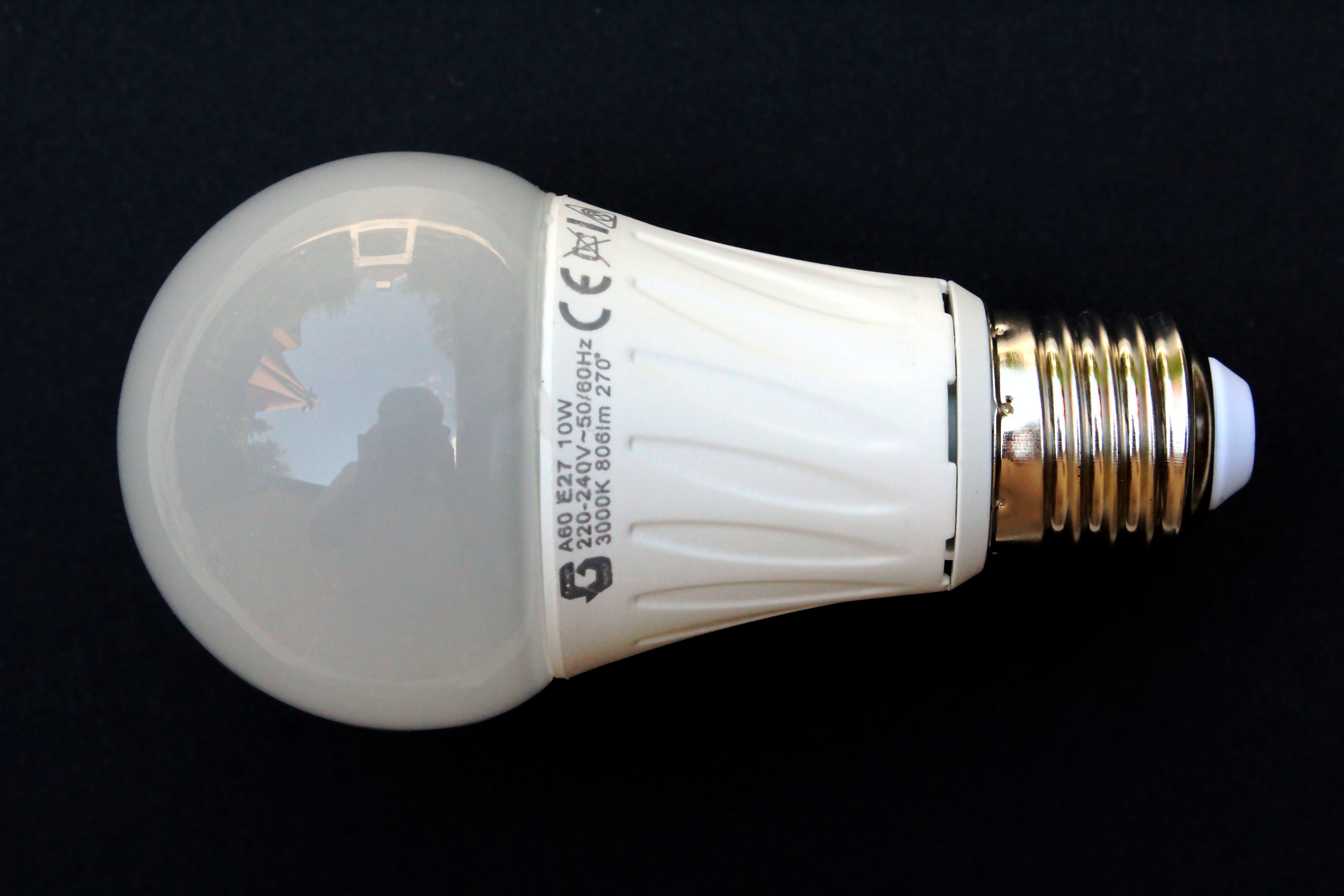
An A60 (A19) LED light bulb with an E27 Edison screw base

Although A-shape bulbs historically used incandescent lighting technology, A-shaped compact fluorescent (CFL) and LED lamps are also commonly available.

== Physical outline ==
The most commonly used A-series light bulb type is an A60 bulb (or its inch-based equivalent, the A19 bulb), which is 60 mm (19/8 in or 2 3/8 in) wide at its widest point and approximately 110 mm (4 3/8 in) in length. Other sizes with a data sheet in IEC 60064 are A50, A55, A67, A68, A71, A75, and A80. Another common A-series light bulb type is the A15 bulb, which is commonly used in the US for appliances and ceiling fans. The A15 bulb is 15/8 in (1 7/8 in; 48 mm) wide at its widest point and 3.39 inches tall.

=== Socket type ===
In countries with a mains supply voltage of 100–120 volts (e.g., Canada, Taiwan, US), A19/A60 light bulbs usually come with an E26-type Edison screw base (i.e., 26 millimeters in diameter). In the UK, Ireland and many Commonwealth countries, they usually come with a B22-type bayonet cap base. In continental Europe and most other countries with a 220–240 volt supply, they usually come with an E27-type base.

=== Specifications ===
IEC/TR 60887:2010 defines the A bulb shape as:

A bulb shape having a spherical end section that is joined to the neck by a radius that (a) has a centre outside the bulb, (b) has a magnitude greater than the radius of the spherical section, (c) and is tangent to both the neck and the curve of the spherical end section.

The same standard also defines in addition to the A shape also bulged (B), conical (C), elliptical (E), flame (F), Globular (G), (K), mushroom (M), (P), reflector (R), straight-sided (S) and tubular (T) bulb shapes, as well as several modifier letters and special shapes. Very similar to the A shape are the P shape ("A bulb having a spherical end section, and a conical mid section, the sides of which are tangent to the curve of the spherical section"), and its PS variant ("Tubular neck section below the bulb and above the approximate reference line").

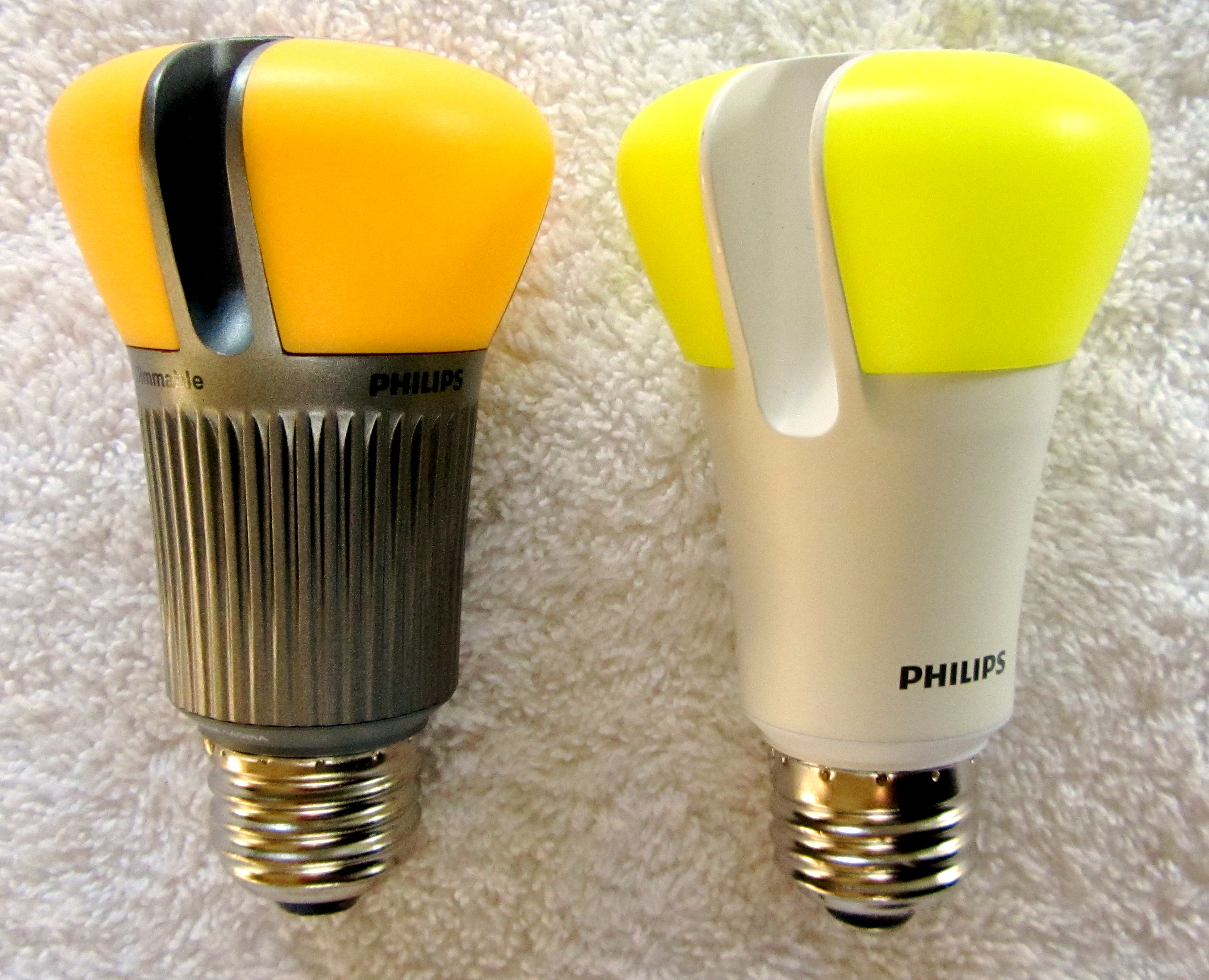
Philips L Prize bulbs count as A19 under Energy Star requirements.

ANSI C79.1-2002, IS 14897:2000, and JIS C 7710:1988 define the "A shape" as "a bulb shape having a spherical end section that is joined to the neck by a radius", where the radius is greater than that of the sphere, corresponds to an osculating circle outside the light bulb, and is tangent to both the neck and the sphere.

The USA Energy Star certification requires omnidirectional light bulbs to fit the overall dimensions of the corresponding ANSI bulb type and a minimum Luminosity/Watt performance level.
