= Mathew Evans =

Canadian inventor

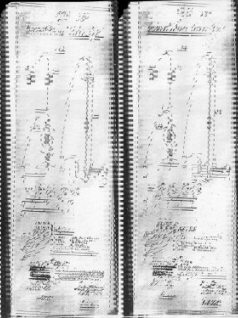
A portion of the 1874 actual patent application.

Mathew Evans is one of two Canadians who developed and patented an incandescent light bulb, on July 24, 1874, five years before Thomas Alva Edison's U.S. patent on the device.

Evans, from Toronto, Ontario, and his friend Henry Woodward, made the light bulb by sending electricity through a filament made of carbon. Evans was a hotelier.
