= Vitrite =

Very low fusing point black glass

Vitrite is a very low fusing point black glass mainly used for the insulation base of electric lamps. It used to be made by the Vitrite Company. Vitrite can be called foam glass because the mineral from which it is obtained is a spongy mass varying in colour from white to black depending on impurities.

== Process ==
To make the electric lamp, molten vitrite is poured into the shell up to a height of approximately a quarter inch (6 millimeters). A plunger is brought down to force the plastic glass into shape and fix the contacts.

== Composition ==
Vitrite is referred to as glass but in fact it is an enamel which contains a high proportion of lead (II) oxide to give fluidity, and considerable quantities of manganese oxide to produce a black colour.
