= Henry Woodward (inventor) =

Canadian inventor (born 1832)

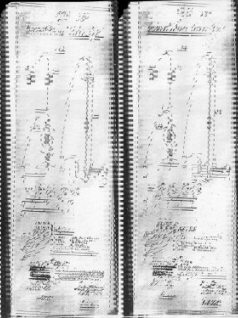
Canadian Patent application

Henry Woodward (born 1832) was a Canadian inventor and a major pioneer in the development of the incandescent lamp.

On July 24, 1874, Woodward and his partner, Mathew Evans, a hotel keeper, filed a Canadian patent application on an electric light bulb. It was granted on August 3, 1874, as Canadian patent number 3,738. Woodward was a medical student at the time. Their light bulb comprised a glass tube with a large piece of carbon connected to two wires. They filled the tube with inert nitrogen to get a longer burn life in the filament. Their light bulb was fully effective and sufficiently promising; they sold their U.S. patent 181,613 to Thomas Edison and due to this Edison is now known for the invention of the light bulb. Thomas Edison obtained an exclusive license to the Canadian patent. Thomas Edison developed his own design of incandescent lamp with a high resistance thin filament of carbon in a high vacuum contained in a tightly sealed glass bulb which had a sufficiently long service life to be commercially practical.

The relationship of the Woodward/Evans work on the incandescent bulb to that of others, including Edison, on electric light is explained in the following passage of an article in a 1900 issue of Electrical World and Engineer as follows:

"The first incandescent lamp [developed by Woodward and Evans] was constructed at Morrison's brass foundry in Toronto and was a very crude affair. It consisted of a water gauge glass with a piece of carbon, filed by hand and drilled at each end, for the electrodes, and hermetically sealed at both ends, having a petcock at one end with a brass tube to exhaust the air. Woodward made the mistake of filling the tube or globe of this lamp with nitrogen after having exhausted the air. Prof. Elihu Thomson is quoted as having said that had he stopped when he had the tube exhausted he would have had the honor of being the inventor of the incandescent light as used for commercial purposes... the principle of the incandescent lamp dates several decades before the Woodward experiments, and that King, Chanzy, Farmer and others in the twenty years preceding 1860 made and used incandescent lamps much superior to the very imperfect one upon which Woodward's claims are based. Moreover, the Edison claims, as sustained in the courts, were not on the discovery of the principles of the incandescent lamp but on a definite combination of parts—all well known—which resulted in the production of a practical form of the incandescent lamp."

Woodward & Evans did not have enough money to develop their invention, so they sold the rights to U.S. Patent 181,613 to Thomas Edison.

The drawings from Woodward's 1876 United States patent are almost identical to those that appeared in Woodward and Evans' 1874 Canadian patent. The carbon burner, a "most important feature of a practical lamp" differs widely from Edison's filament. Several earlier inventors working on the light bulb had progressed as far in their work as Woodward and Evans: Marcellin Jobard in 1838, C. de Changy in 1856, John Wellington Starr in 1845 and Joseph Swan in 1860. Each contributed to the development of the incandescent lamp, but it was Edison who assembled the necessary components to make the first practical electric light bulb.

What is known about Woodward's discovery is that it was patented in Canada and the United States prior to a patent being granted to Edison and it is known that the patent for the Canadian discovery was purchased by Edison when he was making his original investigations and before he obtained his patent.
