= Burnie Lee Benbow =

- Born: 4 July 1885; United States
- Died: 7 April 1976 (aged 90); Cleveland, Ohio, U.S.
- Education: Purdue University (B.S., 1908)
- Occupations: Engineer, Manager, Inventor
- Known for: Invention of the coiled coil filament Contributions to electric lighting technology

Burnie Lee Benbow (4 July 1885 – 7 April 1976) was an American engineer and inventor known for his work in electric lighting. He served for many years as the manager of the Cleveland Wire Works at GE Lighting in Cleveland, Ohio, where his innovations contributed to significant advancements in lighting efficiency and performance.

== Early life and education ==
Benbow was born in the United States on 4 July 1885. He attended Purdue University, graduating with a Bachelor of Science degree in 1908 from the department of electrical engineering. His formal education laid the foundation for a career that merged technical innovation with industrial management.

== Career and contributions ==
After completing his studies, Benbow began his career in electrical engineering and eventually became the manager of the Cleveland Wire Works, a division of GE Lighting. In 1917, he patented a design for a "coiled coil filament" that improved the efficiency and lifespan of incandescent lightbulbs.This innovation was part of a series of technological advancements in the early twentieth century that transformed the electric lighting industry.

== Selected patents ==
- U.S. Patent 1,247,068 – Coiled Coil Filament (1917)
