= Tubelight (disambiguation) =

A tubelight is a fluorescent lamp/bulb

Tubelight may also refer to:

- Tubelight (2017 Hindi film), a war drama by Kabir Khan
- Tubelight (2017 Tamil film), a romantic comedy by Indra

== See also ==
- Light tube (disambiguation)
