= Electric light =

Device for producing light from electricity

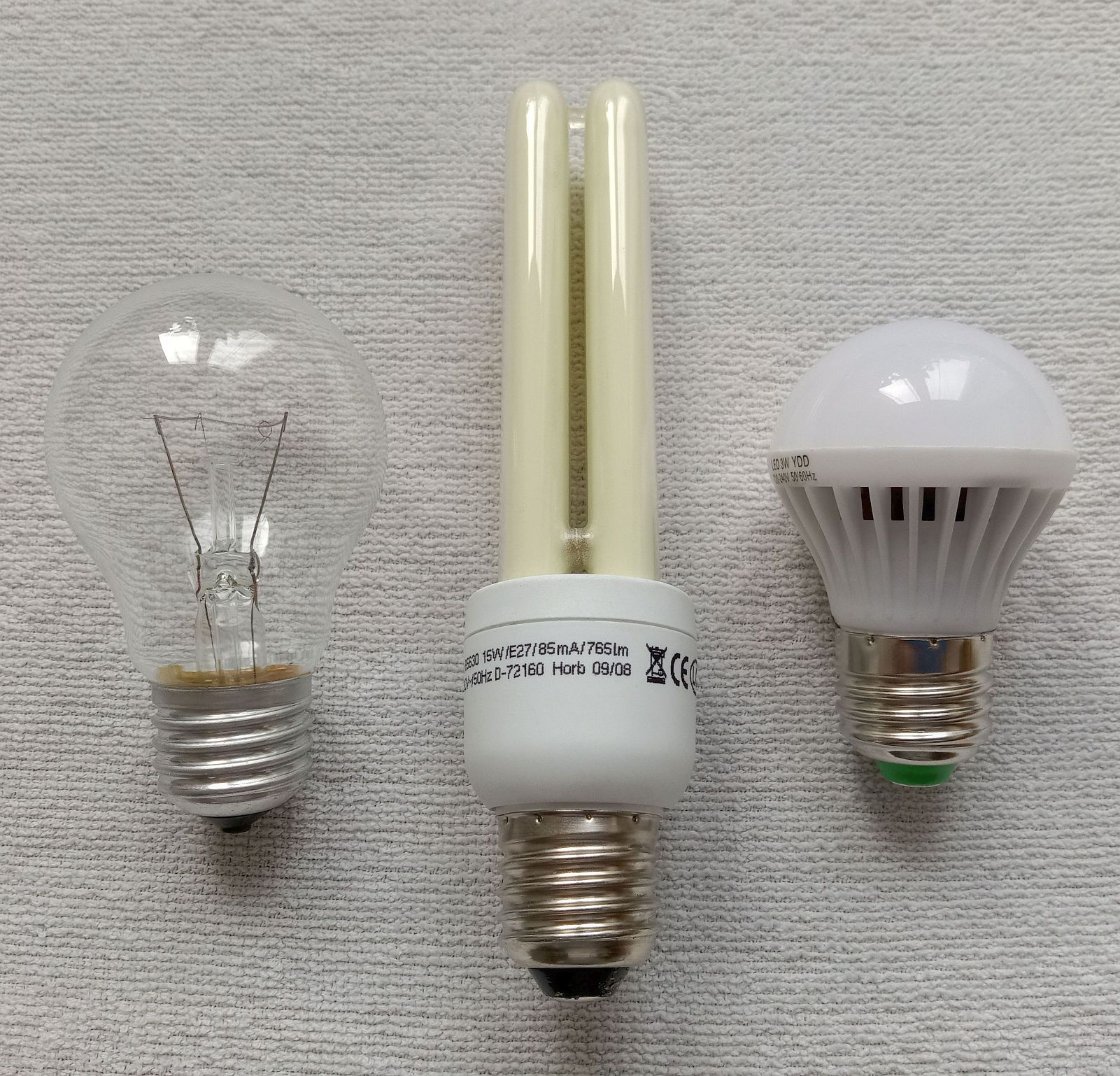
- Incandescent, compact fluorescent, and LED lamps
- Working principle: Incandescence, fluorescence, electroluminescence
- Inventor: Humphry Davy
- Invention year: 1800s
- First produced: 1880s

Electronic symbol

An electric light, lamp, or light bulb is an electrical device that produces light from electricity. It is the most common form of artificial lighting. Lamps usually have a base made of ceramic, metal, glass, or plastic that secures them in the socket of a light fixture. (Note: Some types of portable light fixture are also commonly referred to as lamps.) The electrical connection to the socket may be made with a screw-thread base, two metal pins, two metal caps or a bayonet mount.

The three main categories of electric lights are incandescent lamps, which produce light by a filament heated white-hot by electric current, gas-discharge lamps, which produce light by means of an electric arc through a gas, such as fluorescent lamps, and LED lamps, which produce light by a flow of electrons across a band gap in a semiconductor.

The energy efficiency of electric lighting has significantly improved since the first demonstrations of arc lamps and incandescent light bulbs in the 19th century. Modern electric light sources come in a profusion of types and sizes adapted to many applications. Most modern electric lighting is powered by centrally generated electric power, but lighting may also be powered by mobile or standby electric generators or battery systems. Battery-powered light is often reserved for when and where stationary lights fail, often in the form of flashlights or electric lanterns, as well as in vehicles.

== History ==
Before electric lighting became common in the early 20th century, people used candles, gas lights, oil lamps, and fires. In 1799–1800, Alessandro Volta created the voltaic pile, the first electric battery. Current from these batteries could heat copper wire to incandescence. Vasily Vladimirovich Petrov developed the first persistent electric arc in 1802, and English chemist Humphry Davy gave a practical demonstration of an arc light in 1806. It took more than a century of continuous and incremental improvement, including numerous designs, patents, and resulting intellectual property disputes, to get from these early experiments to commercially produced incandescent light bulbs in the 1920s.

In 1840, Warren de la Rue enclosed a platinum coil in a vacuum tube and passed an electric current through it, thus creating one of the world's first electric light bulbs. The design was based on the concept that the high melting point of platinum would allow it to operate at high temperatures and that the evacuated chamber would contain fewer gas molecules to react with the platinum, improving its longevity. Although it was an efficient design, the cost of the platinum made it impractical for commercial use.

William Greener, an English inventor, made significant contributions to early electric lighting with his lamp in 1846 (patent specification 11076), laying the groundwork for future innovations such as those by Thomas Edison.

The late 1870s and 1880s were marked by intense competition and innovation, with inventors like Joseph Swan in the UK and Thomas Edison in the US independently developing functional incandescent lamps. Swan's bulbs, based on designs by William Staite, were successful, but the filaments were too thick. Edison worked to create bulbs with thinner filaments and better vacuum, producing a more commercially viable light bulb. The rivalry between Swan and Edison eventually led to a merger, forming the Edison and Swan Electric Light Company, which sold lamps with a new filament designed by Swan. By the early twentieth century, these had completely replaced arc lamps.

The turn of the century saw further improvements in bulb longevity and efficiency, notably with the introduction of the tungsten filament by William D. Coolidge, who applied for a patent in 1912. This innovation became a standard for incandescent bulbs for many years.

In 1910, Georges Claude introduced the first neon light, paving the way for neon signs which would become ubiquitous in advertising.

In 1934, Arthur Compton, a famous physicist and GE consultant, reported to the GE lamp department on successful experiments with fluorescent lighting at General Electric Co., Ltd. in Great Britain (unrelated to General Electric in the United States). Stimulated by this report, and with all of the key elements available, a team led by George E. Inman built a prototype fluorescent lamp in 1934 at General Electric's Nela Park (Ohio) engineering laboratory. This was not a trivial exercise; as noted by Arthur A. Bright, "A great deal of experimentation had to be done on lamp sizes and shapes, cathode construction, gas pressures of both argon and mercury vapor, colors of fluorescent powders, methods of attaching them to the inside of the tube, and other details of the lamp and its auxiliaries before the new device was ready for the public."

The first practical LED arrived in 1962. These early LEDs were inefficient and could only display deep red colors, making them unsuitable for general lighting and restricting their usage to numeric displays and indicator lights.

The first high-brightness blue LED was demonstrated by Shuji Nakamura of Nichia Corporation in 1994. The existence of blue LEDs led to the development of the first 'white LED', which employed a phosphor coating to partially convert the emitted blue light to lower frequencies, creating white light. By the start of the 21st century, LED lamps suitable for general lighting were entering the market, and in 2009 Philips introduced the first lamps designed to replace standard 60 W "Edison screw fixture" light bulbs.

A phase-out of incandescent light bulbs took place worldwide in the first few decades of the 21st century, driven by a combination of government regulation and consumer preference for higher energy efficiency and longer-lived bulbs. By 2019 electricity usage in the United States had decreased for at least five straight years, due in part to US consumers replacing incandescent light bulbs with LEDs.

== Types ==
=== Incandescent ===
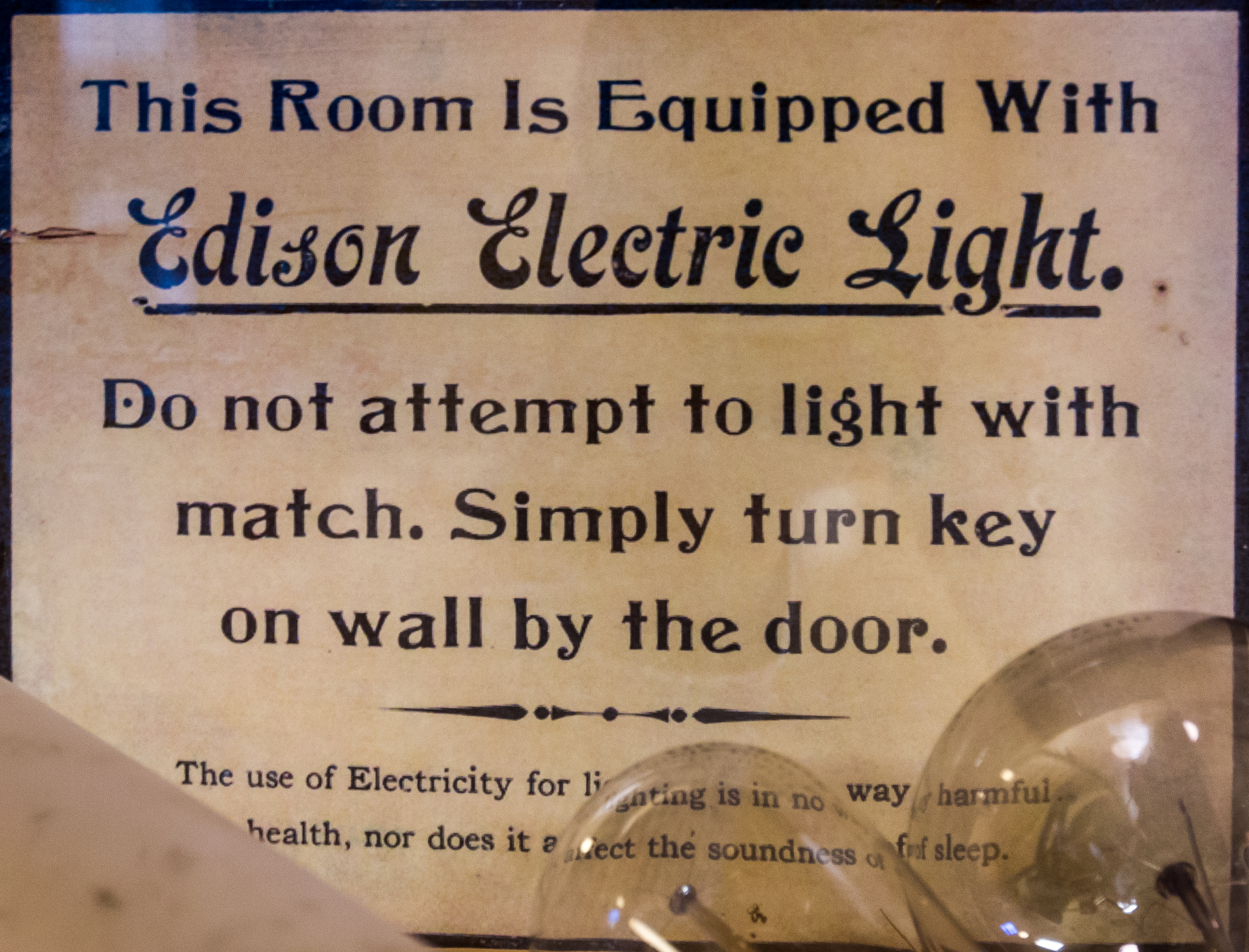
Sign with instructions on the use of light bulbs

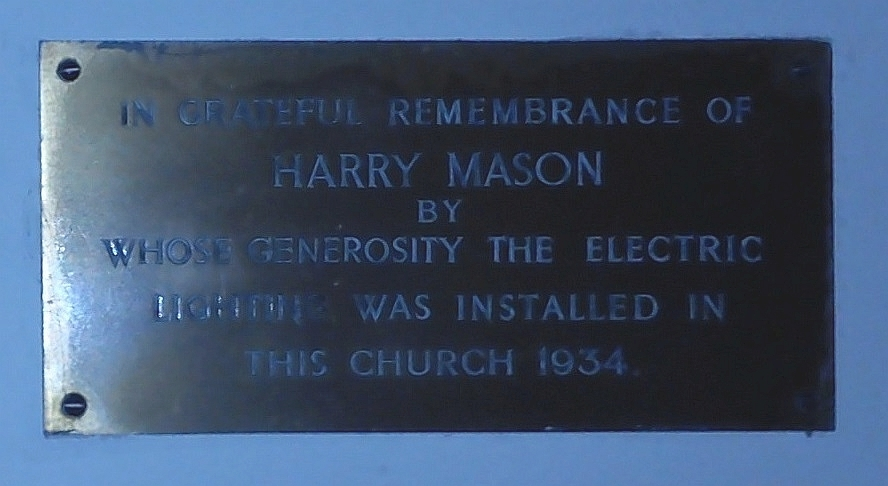
A tablet at St John the Baptist Church, Hagley commemorates the installation of electric light in 1934.

In its modern form, the incandescent light bulb consists of a coiled filament of tungsten sealed in a globular glass chamber, either a vacuum or full of an inert gas such as argon. When an electric current is connected, the tungsten is heated to 2,000 to 3,300 K (1,730 to 3,030 °C; 3,140 to 5,480 °F) and glows, emitting light that approximates a continuous spectrum.

Incandescent bulbs are highly inefficient, in that just 2–5% of the energy consumed is emitted as visible, usable light. The remaining 95% is lost as heat. In warmer climates, the emitted heat must then be removed, putting additional pressure on ventilation or air conditioning systems. In colder weather, the heat byproduct has some value, and has been successfully harnessed for warming in devices such as heat lamps. Incandescent bulbs are nonetheless being phased out in favor of technologies like CFLs and LED bulbs in many countries due to their low energy efficiency. The European Commission estimated in 2012 that a complete ban on incandescent bulbs would contribute 5 to 10 billion euros to the economy and save 15 billion metric tonnes of carbon dioxide emissions.

=== Halogen ===
Halogen lamps are usually much smaller than standard incandescent lamps, because for successful operation a bulb temperature over 200 °C is generally necessary. For this reason, most have a bulb of fused silica (quartz) or aluminosilicate glass. This is often sealed inside an additional layer of glass. The outer glass is a safety precaution, to reduce ultraviolet emission and to contain hot glass shards should the inner envelope explode during operation. Oily residue from fingerprints may cause a hot quartz envelope to shatter due to excessive heat buildup at the contamination site. The risk of burns or fire is also greater with bare bulbs, leading to their prohibition in some places, unless enclosed by the luminaire.

Those designed for 12- or 24-volt operation have compact filaments, useful for good optical control. Also, they have higher efficacies (lumens per watt) and longer lives than non-halogen types. The light output remains almost constant throughout their life.

=== Fluorescent ===
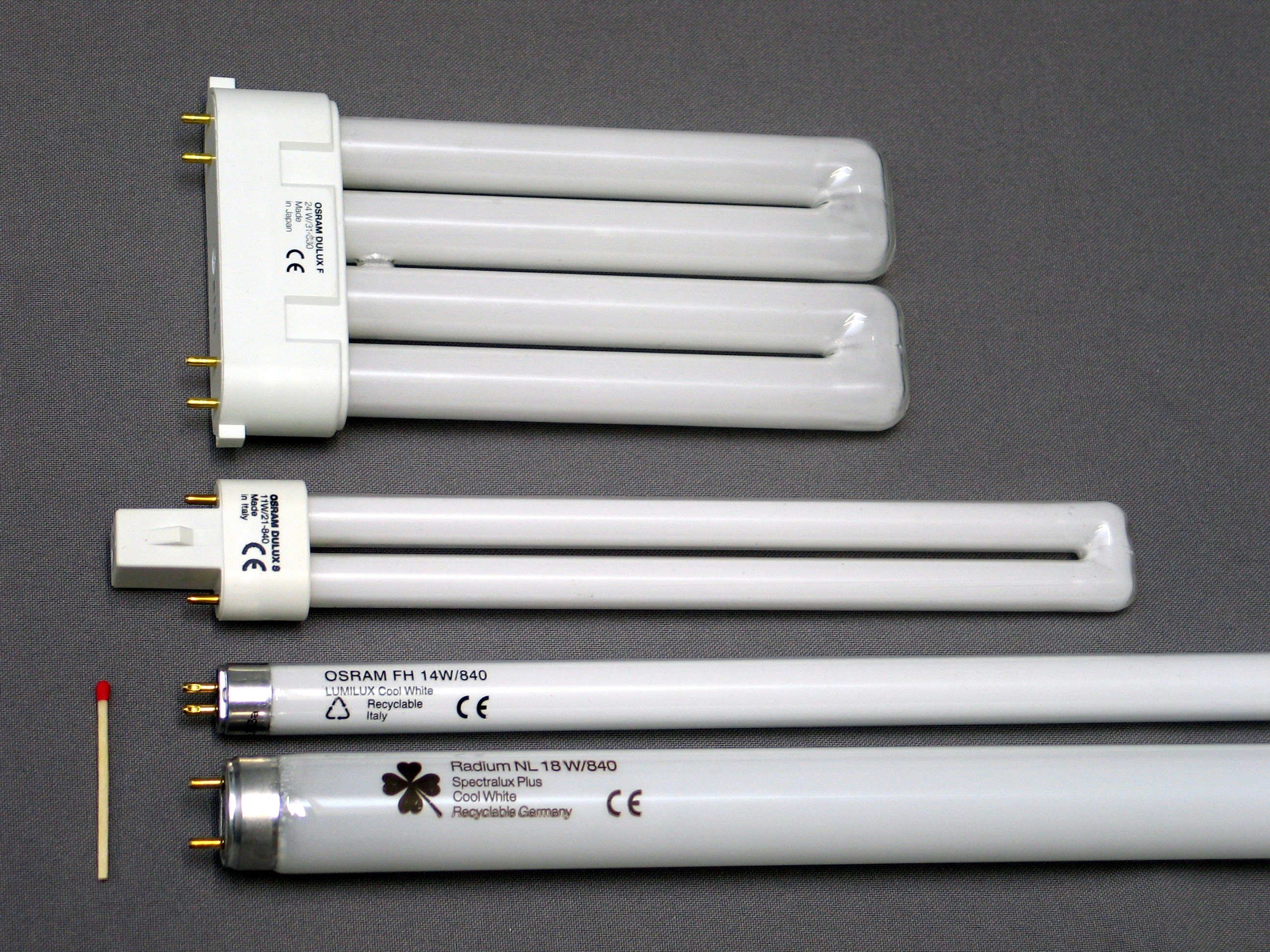
Top, two compact fluorescent lamps. Bottom, two fluorescent tube lamps. A matchstick, left, is shown for scale.

Fluorescent lamps consist of a glass tube that contains mercury vapour or argon under low pressure. Electricity flowing through the tube causes the gases to give off ultraviolet energy. The inside of the tubes are coated with phosphors that give off visible light when struck by ultraviolet photons. They have much higher efficiency than incandescent lamps. For the same amount of light generated, they typically use around one-quarter to one-third the power of an incandescent. The typical luminous efficacy of fluorescent lighting systems is 50–100 lumens per watt, several times the efficacy of incandescent bulbs with comparable light output. Fluorescent lamp fixtures are more costly than incandescent lamps, because they require a ballast to regulate the current through the lamp, but the lower energy cost typically offsets the higher initial cost. Compact fluorescent lamps are available in the same popular sizes as incandescent lamps and are used as an energy-saving alternative in homes. Because they contain mercury, many fluorescent lamps are classified as hazardous waste. The United States Environmental Protection Agency recommends that fluorescent lamps be segregated from general waste for recycling or safe disposal, and some jurisdictions require recycling of them.

=== LED ===
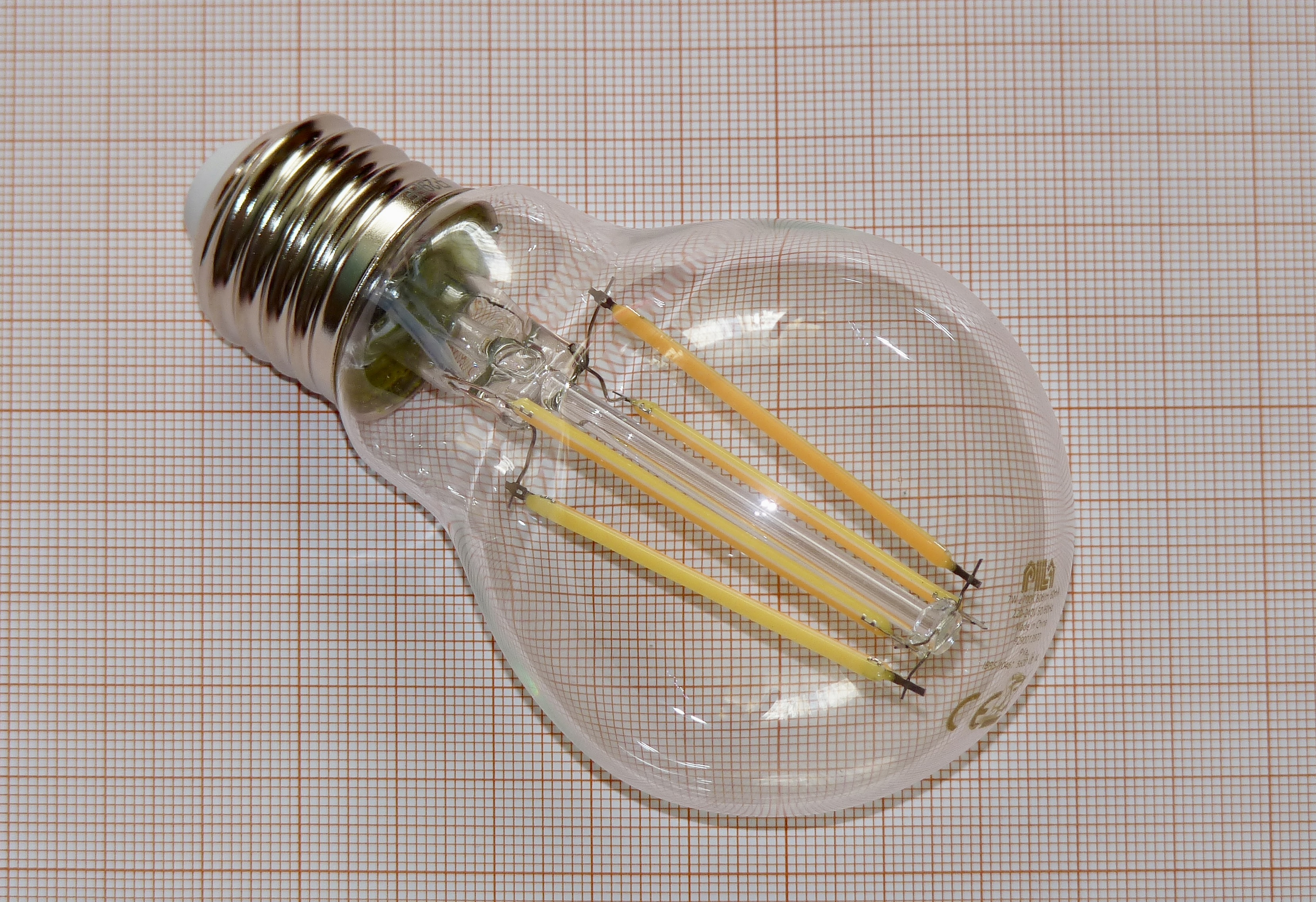
LED lamp with E27 Edison screw base

The solid-state light-emitting diode (LED) has been popular as an indicator light in consumer electronics and professional audio gear since the 1970s. In the 2000s, efficacy and output have risen to the point where LEDs are now being used in lighting applications such as car headlights and brake lights, in flashlights and bicycle lights, as well as in decorative applications, such as holiday lighting. Indicator LEDs are known for their extremely long life, up to 100,000 hours, but lighting LEDs are operated much less conservatively, and consequently have shorter lives. LED technology is useful for lighting designers, because of its low power consumption, low heat generation, instantaneous on/off control, and in the case of single color LEDs, continuity of color throughout the life of the diode and relatively low cost of manufacture. LED lifetime depends strongly on the temperature of the diode. Operating an LED lamp in conditions that increase the internal temperature can greatly shorten the lamp's life. Some lasers have been adapted as an alternative to LEDs to provide highly focused illumination.

=== Carbon arc ===
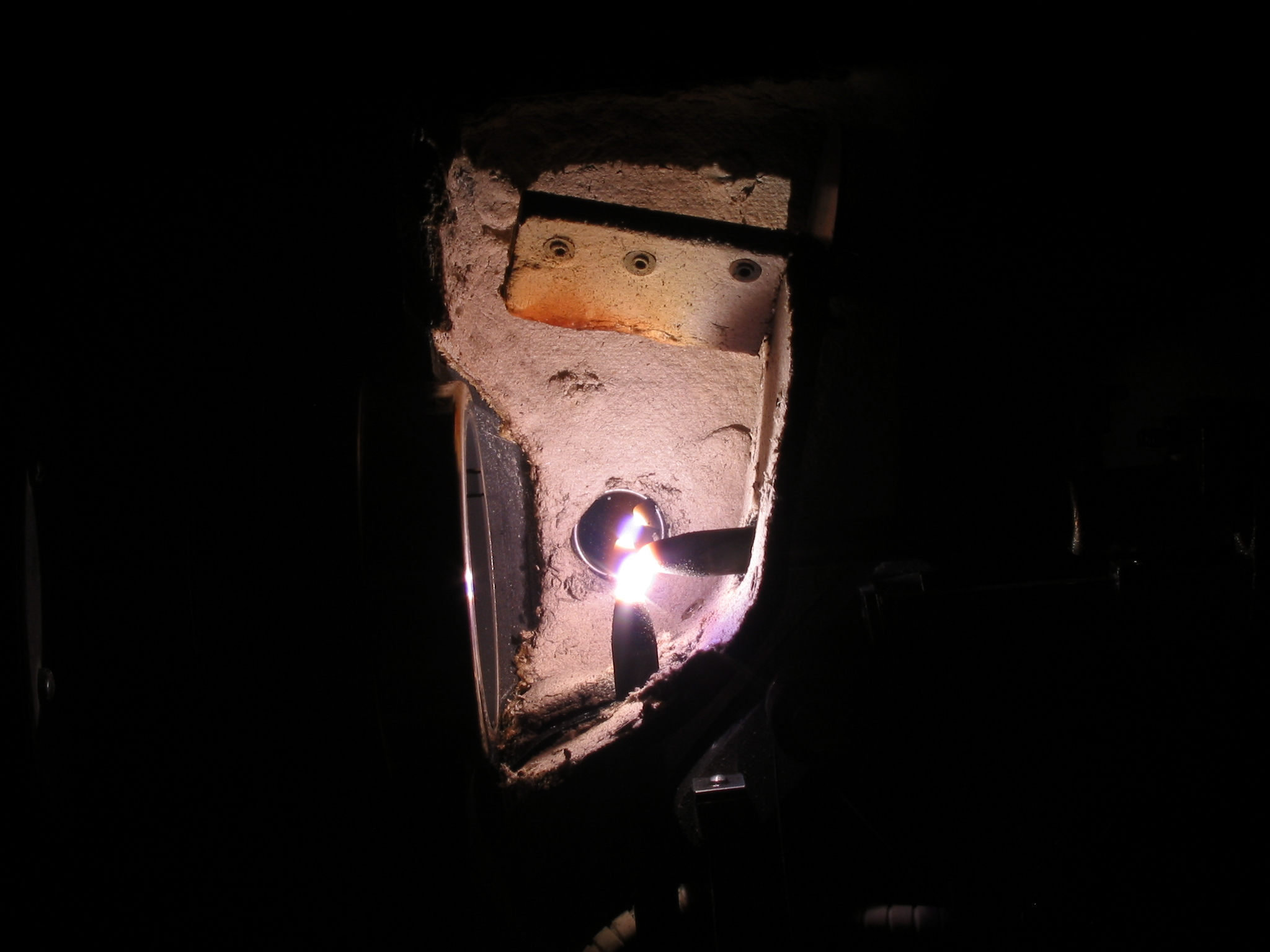
Carbon arc lamp in operation, with arc visible

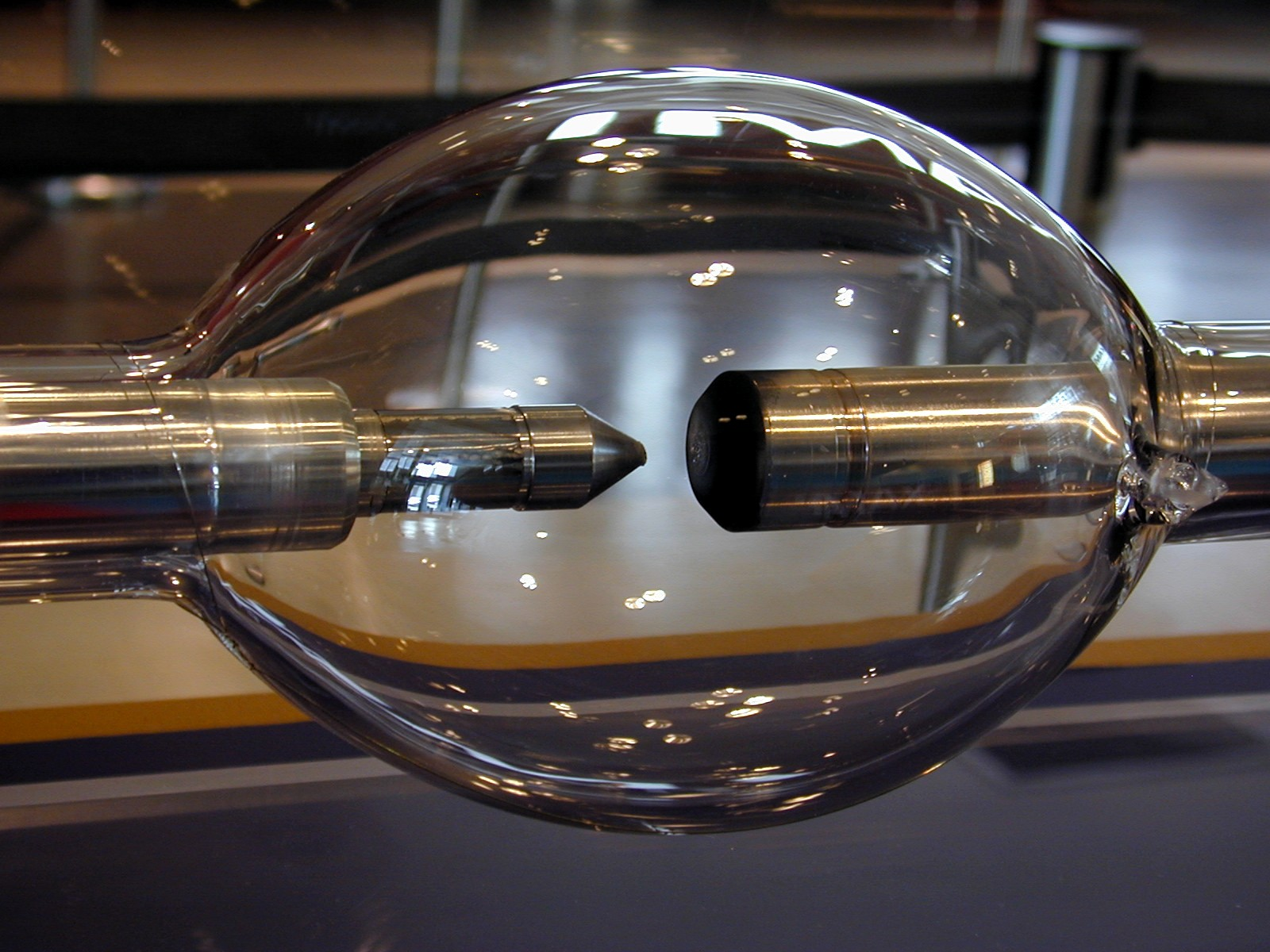
The 15 kW xenon arc lamp used in the IMAX projection system

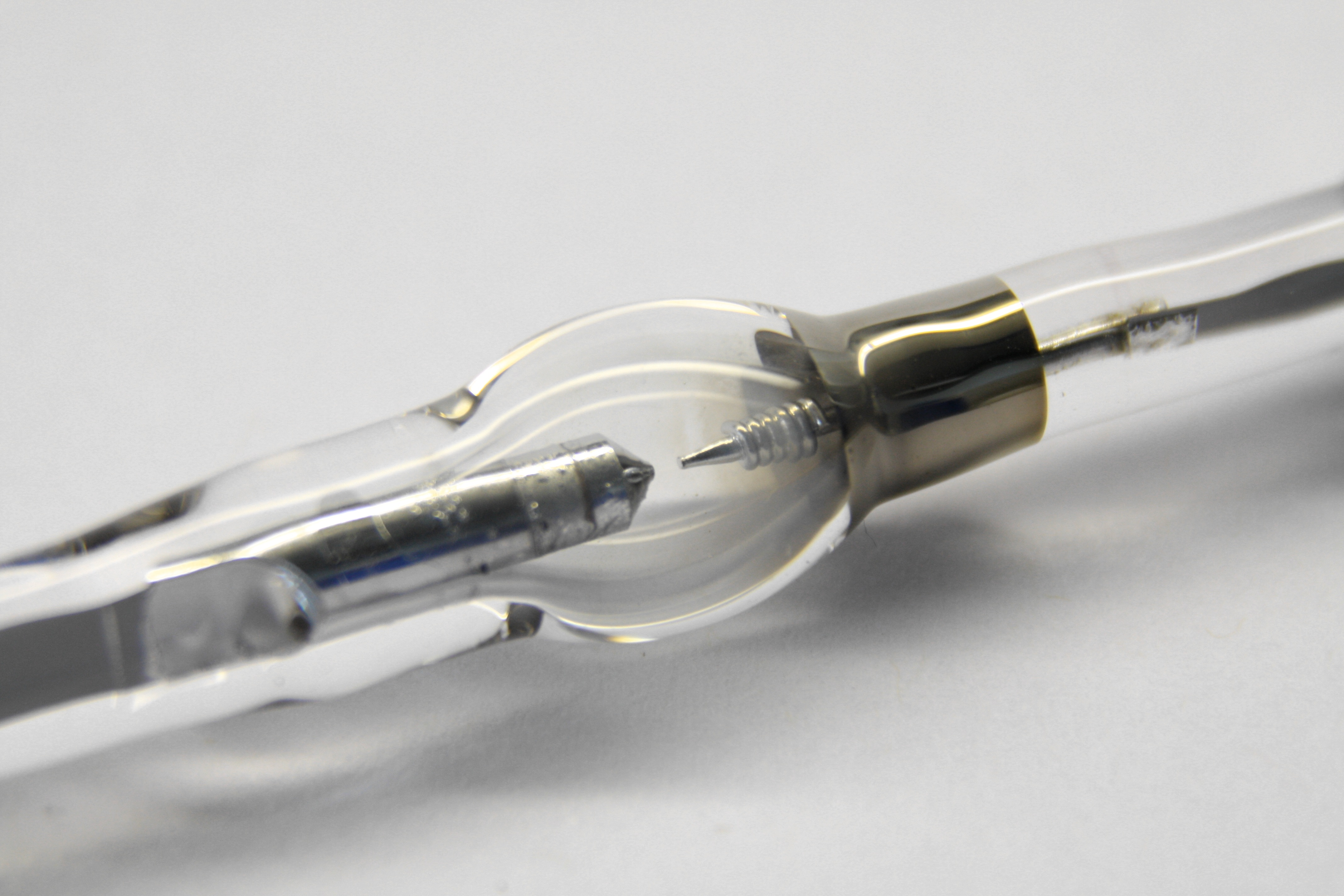
A mercury arc lamp from a fluorescence microscope

Carbon arc lamps consist of two carbon rod electrodes in open air, supplied by a current-limiting ballast. The electric arc is struck by touching the rod tips then separating them. The ensuing arc produces a white-hot plasma between the rod tips. These lamps have higher efficacy than filament lamps, but the carbon rods are short-lived and require constant adjustment in use, as the intense heat of the arc erodes them. The lamps produce significant ultraviolet output, they require ventilation when used indoors, and due to their intensity they need protection from direct sight.

Invented by Humphry Davy around 1805, the carbon arc was the first practical electric light. It was used commercially beginning in the 1870s for large building and street lighting until it was superseded in the early 20th century by the incandescent light. Carbon arc lamps operate at high power and produce high intensity white light. They also are a point source of light. They remained in use in limited applications that required these properties, such as movie projectors, stage lighting, and searchlights, until after World War II.

=== Discharge ===
A discharge lamp has a glass or silica envelope containing two metal electrodes separated by a gas. Gases used include, neon, argon, xenon, sodium, metal halides, and mercury. The core operating principle is much the same as the carbon arc lamp, but the term "arc lamp" normally refers to carbon arc lamps, with more modern types of gas discharge lamp normally called discharge lamps. With some discharge lamps, very high voltage is used to strike the arc. This requires an electrical circuit called an igniter, which is part of the electrical ballast circuitry. After the arc is struck, the internal resistance of the lamp drops to a low level, and the ballast limits the current to the operating current. Without a ballast, excess current would flow, causing rapid destruction of the lamp.

Some lamp types contain a small amount of neon, which permits striking at normal running voltage with no external ignition circuitry. Low-pressure sodium lamps operate this way. The simplest ballasts are just an inductor, and are chosen where cost is the deciding factor, such as street lighting. More advanced electronic ballasts may be designed to maintain constant light output over the life of the lamp, may drive the lamp with a square wave to maintain completely flicker-free output, and shut down in the event of certain faults.

The most efficient source of electric light is the low-pressure sodium lamp. It produces, for all practical purposes, a monochromatic orange-yellow light, which gives a similarly monochromatic perception of any illuminated scene. For this reason, it is generally reserved for outdoor public lighting applications. Low-pressure sodium lights are favoured for public lighting by astronomers, since the light pollution that they generate can be easily filtered, contrary to broadband or continuous spectra.

== Characteristics ==
=== Form factor ===
Many lamp units, or light bulbs, are specified in standardized shape codes and socket names. Incandescent bulbs and their retrofit replacements are often specified as "A19/A60 E26/E27", a common size for those kinds of light bulbs. In this example, the "A" parameters describe the bulb size and shape within the A-series light bulb while the "E" parameters describe the Edison screw base size and thread characteristics.

=== Comparison parameters ===
Common comparison parameters include:

- Luminous flux (in lumens)
- Energy consumption (in watts)
- Luminous efficacy (in lumens per watt)
- Color temperature (in kelvins)

Less common parameters include color rendering index (CRI).

=== Life expectancy ===
Life expectancy for many types of lamp is defined as the number of hours of operation at which 50% of them fail, that is the median life of the lamps. Production tolerances as low as 1% can create a variance of 25% in lamp life, so in general some lamps will fail well before the rated life expectancy, and some will last much longer. For LEDs, lamp life is defined as the operation time at which 50% of lamps have experienced a 70% decrease in light output. In the 1900s the Phoebus cartel formed in an attempt to reduce the life of electric light bulbs, an example of planned obsolescence.

Some types of lamp are also sensitive to switching cycles. Rooms with frequent switching, such as bathrooms, can expect much shorter lamp life than what is printed on the box. Compact fluorescent lamps are particularly sensitive to switching cycles.

== Uses ==
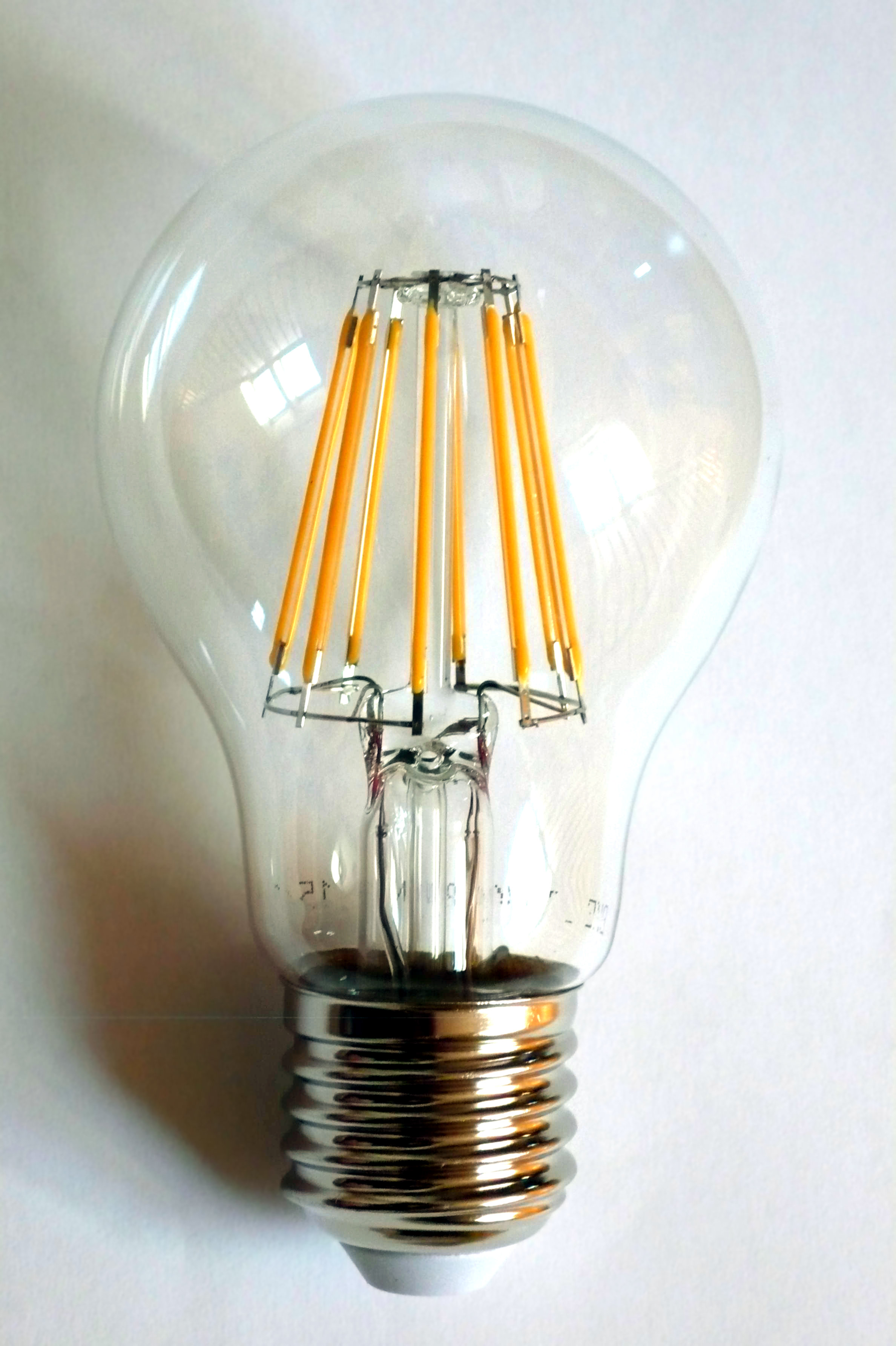
A clear glass LED filament lamp

The total amount of artificial light (especially from street lights) is sufficient for cities to be easily visible at night from the air, and from space. External lighting grew at a rate of 3–6 percent for the later half of the 20th century and is the major source of light pollution that burdens astronomers and others with 80% of the world's population living in areas with night time light pollution. Light pollution has been shown to have a negative effect on some wildlife.

Electric lamps can be used as heat sources, for example in incubators, as infrared lamps in fast food restaurants and toys such as the Kenner Easy-Bake Oven.

Lamps can also be used for light therapy to deal with such issues as vitamin D deficiency, skin conditions such as acne and dermatitis, skin cancers, and seasonal affective disorder. Lamps which emit a specific frequency of blue light are also used to treat neonatal jaundice with the treatment which was initially undertaken in hospitals being able to be conducted at home.

Electric lamps can also be used as a grow light to aid in plant growth especially in indoor hydroponics and aquatic plants with recent research into the most effective types of light for plant growth.

== Cultural symbolism ==
In Western culture, a lightbulb—in particular, the appearance of an illuminated lightbulb above a person's head—signifies sudden inspiration.

A stylized depiction of a light bulb features as the logo of the Turkish AK Party.

== See also ==
- Flameless candle
- LED tube
- Light tube (for daylighting)
- List of light sources
