= Light tube (disambiguation) =

A light tube is used for transporting natural or artificial light for illumination.

Light tube or light pipe may also refer to:

- Waveguide (optics), a device for light transport in photonic devices
- Fluorescent lamp, a tubular light-emitting device
- In professional wrestling, "light tube" refers to a fluorescent lamp used as a weapon in certain hardcore matches.
- LED tube lamps
- ADAT Lightpipe, a protocol for digital audio signals
- Krause-Ogle box, a waveguide (light pipe) used in nuclear testing

== See also ==
- Solar chimney, a ventilation device
