= LED tube =

Type of lamp

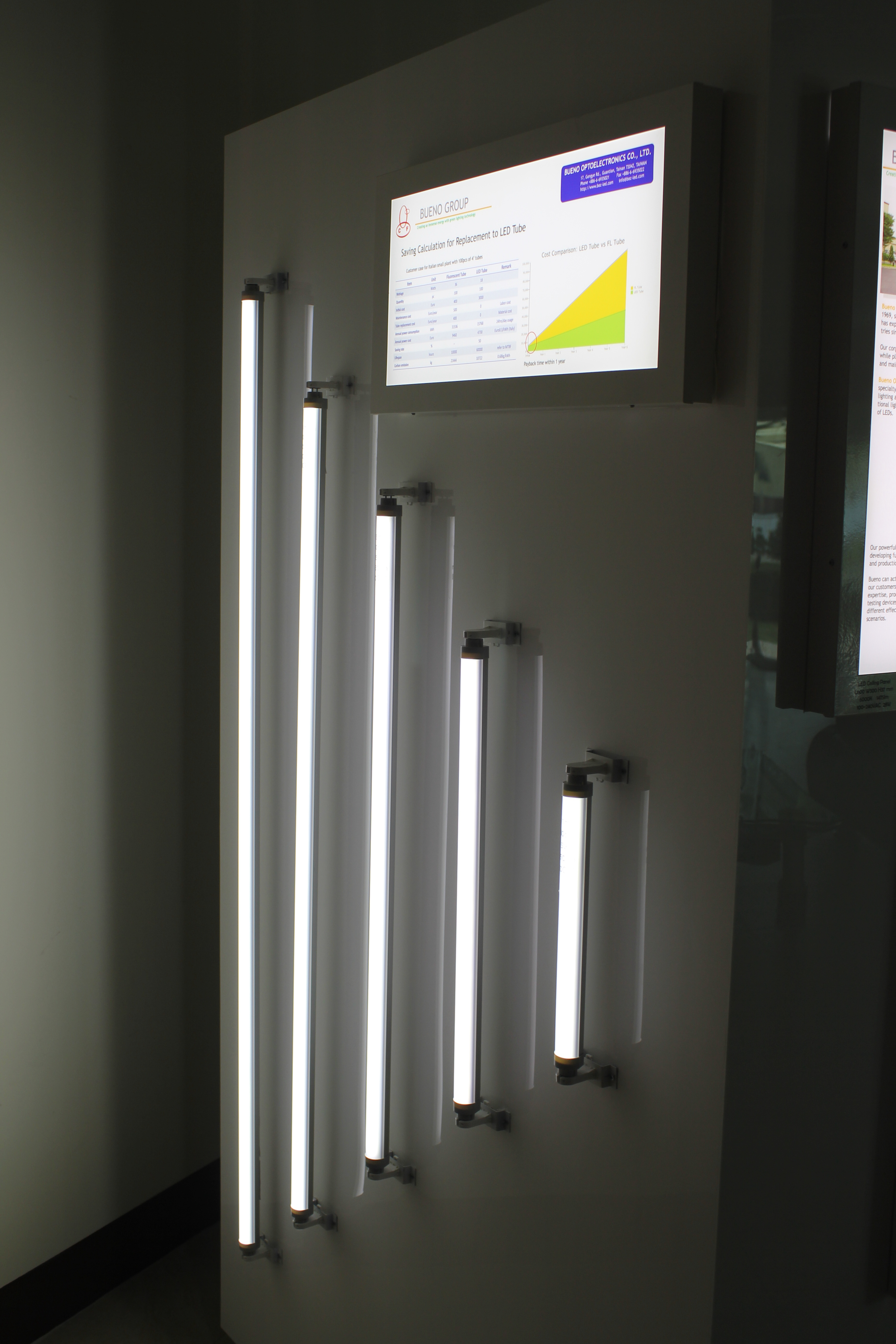
LED tubes

LED tube is a type of LED lamp used in fluorescent tube luminaires with G5 and G13 bases to replace traditional fluorescent tubes. As compared to fluorescent tubes, the most important advantages of LED tubes are energy efficiency and long service life. LED tubes are sometimes also referred to as ‘LED fluorescent tubes’.

== General ==
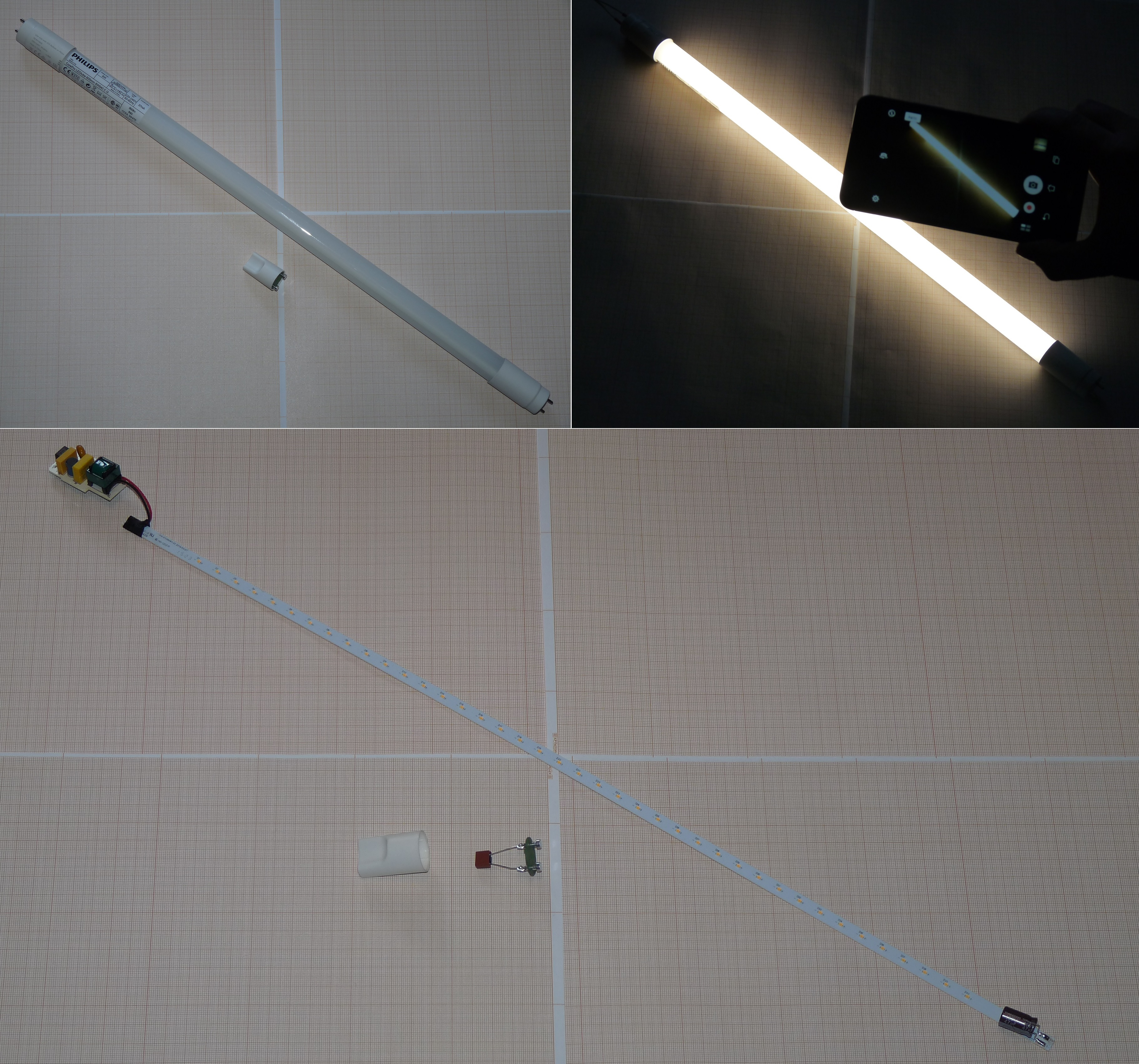
LED tube with specific starter

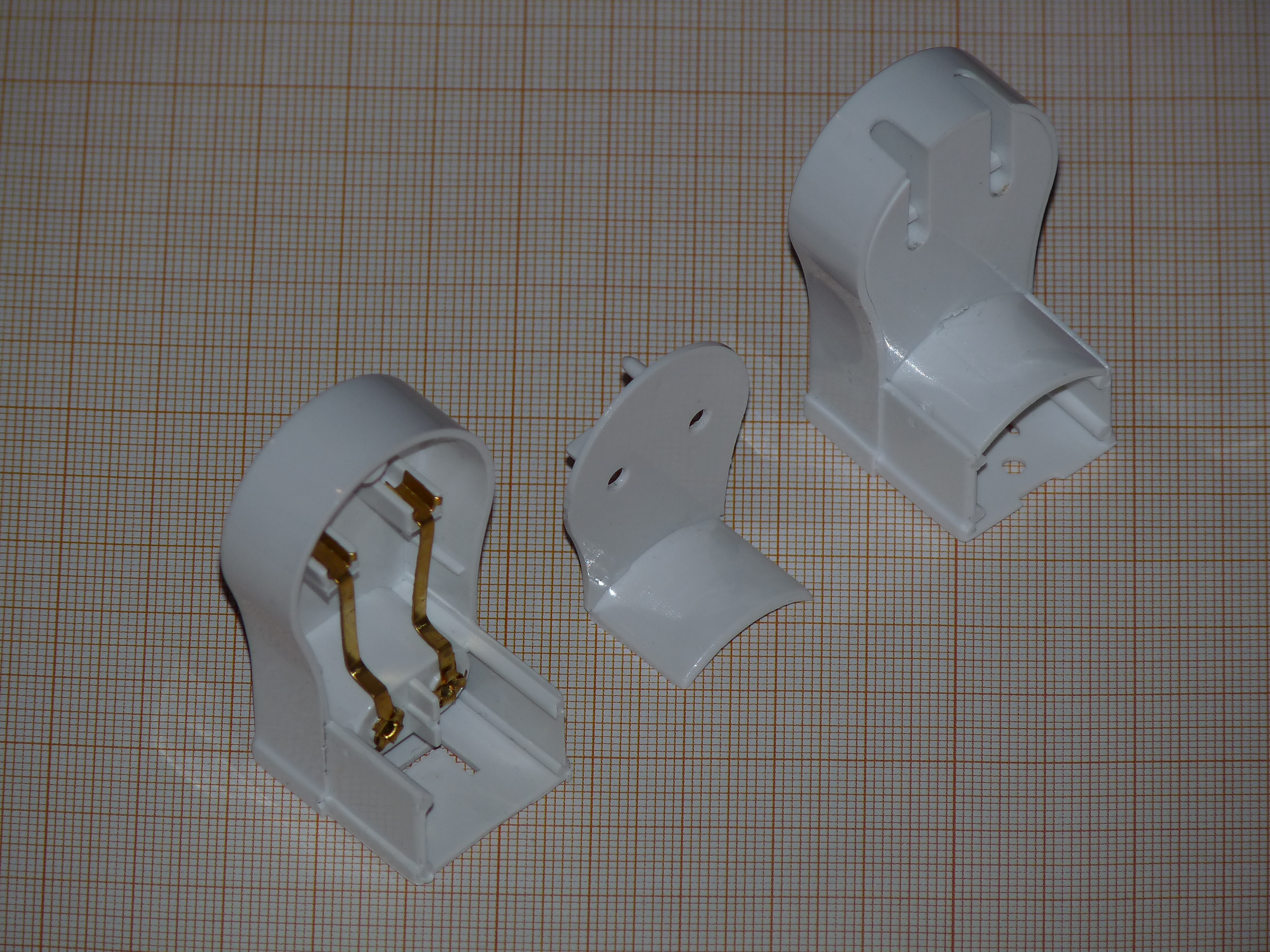
Specific lampholder with direct connection between AC and lamp contacts

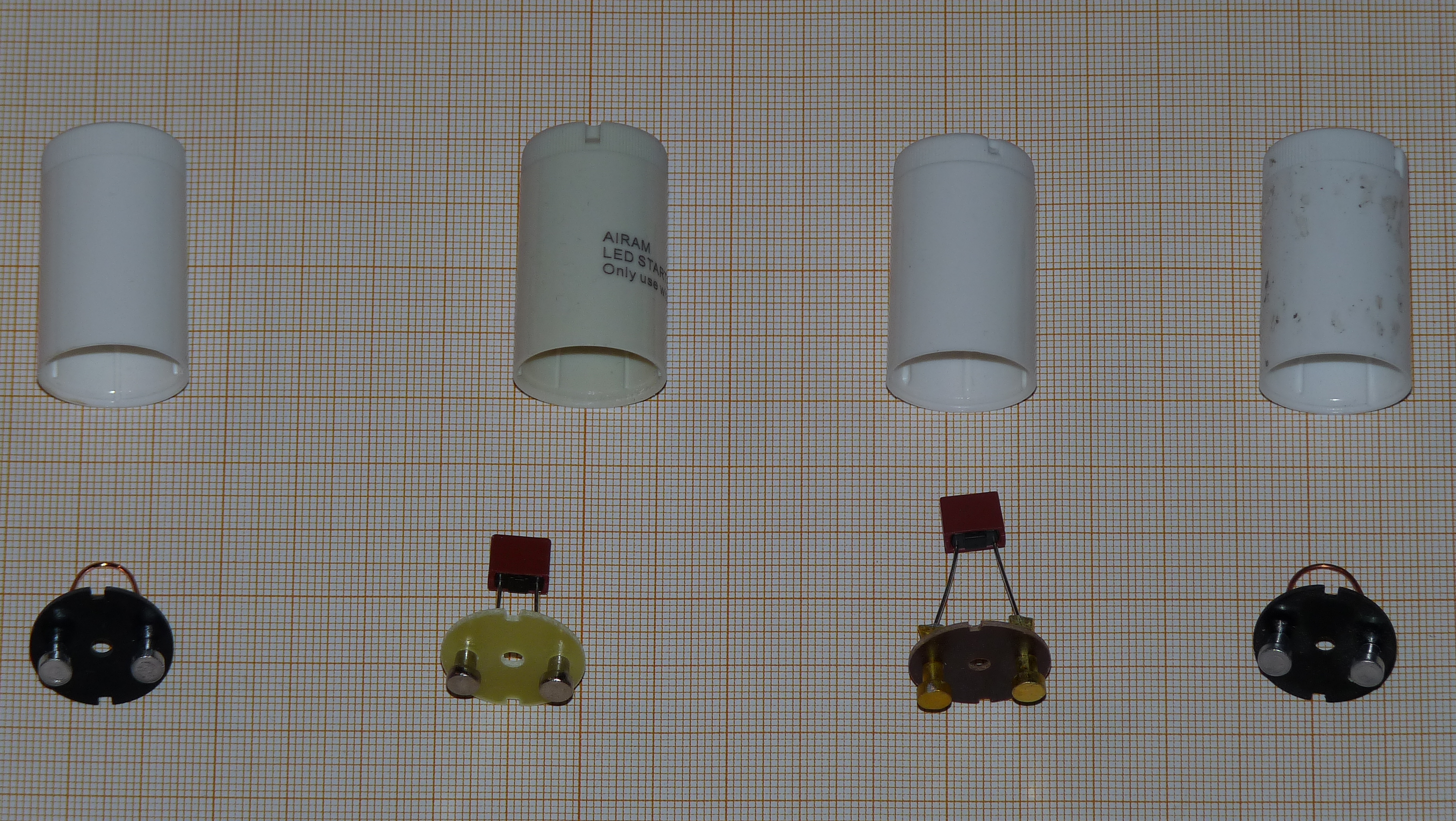
Dummy starters

In December 2014 a standard for LED tubes (EN62776) was completed which guarantees a safe replacement of the traditional T8 Fluorescent tube. Thanks to the standard, it is possible to replace old fluorescent tubes with LED tubes and use standardised LED tubes regardless of brand.

There are several different types of LED tubes available for T8 fluorescent lamp replacement:

1. LED tubes based on Retro-Fit design can typically be installed in place of former fluorescent tubes in compatible luminaires as they are, with consideration of manufacturer and lamp-specific restrictions. Some models are only compatible with magnetic ballasts, but models that can be installed in any old fluorescent tube luminaire are also available on the market. In some Retro-Fit LED tubes, a special LED starter is used in place of the fluorescent lamp starter. Re-introduction of fluorescent lamps is still possible merely by lamp and starter replacement. If used in luminaires equipped with compensation capacitors, LED tubes often generate a lot of reactive power. Most LED tubes based on Retro-Fit design are manufactured according to the LED tube standard EN62776.
2. In case of Conversion Kit design-based installations, old luminaires and their wiring are modified for LED tube introduction. In such cases, the installation works need to be performed by a qualified electrical contractor. Modification targets often include fluorescent lamp luminaires with so-called electronic ballast.
3. LED tubes that are only available as part of a dedicated lighting fixture. The package may also include control electronics that are external to the LED tube, and the LED tubes do not comply with the LED tube standard EN 62776. Retro-fit LED tubes (installation method 1 above) can also often be installed in fixtures designed for LED tubes. In these cases, the fixture typically only acts as a frame or holder to the tube, and electricity supply to the tubes uses the conductors in the fixture. The LED tube may also be compliant with standard EN 62776.
4. LED tubes that are compatible with an electronic (HF) ballast. These LED tubes require a fixture that includes a functioning electronic ballast. This type has the advantage of easy upgrade of the LED tube (compared to installation method 2). Expensive maintenance is a downside. In addition to the LED tube, also the electronic ballast may fail, and it can only be replaced by a qualified electrician. If a LED tube that is compatible with an electronic ballast is installed in an old fluorescent fixture, the question of responsibility must be clarified. Who will be liable for the electronic ballast if it breaks when the LED tube is being installed? The original supplier of the fixture and the coupling device will no longer be responsible if LED tubes with an electronic ballast are used. Therefore, it is worth considering whether electronic ballasts should be scrapped when LED tubes are fitted in old fixtures, particularly in extensive switchover projects. The term retro-fit is also used to refer to these tubes, as the new LED tube will fit into the old fixture without modification. In these cases, the LED tubes may also be compliant with the EN 62776 standard.
5. LED tubes compatible with the narrow T5 fluorescent tubes are also being introduced to the markets. They mainly comply with types 3 and 4 above: they are delivered as part of a lighting fixture with external control electronics, or they require a T5 fixture with electronic ballast.

The LED tube standard EN 62776 is based on the international standard IEC 62776 (Double-capped LED lamps designed to retrofit linear fluorescent lamps – Safety Specifications), which applies to LED tubes compatible with a magnetic as well as an electronic ballast.

== History ==
The exact birth time of LED tubes is difficult to establish, but most of the patents on the subject originate from the 2000s. The development of white LEDs in early 2000s made it possible to use LEDs for general lighting. Until 2012 LED tubes were mainly manufactured in China. However, since then, manufacture or assembly have also been launched in Finland, for example.

1st generation of Retro-Fit LED tubes
So-called 1st generation Retro-Fit LED tubes were introduced on the market between 2005 and 2010, and not much attention was paid on quality or safety. In 2010, European safety authorities, including the Finnish Safety and Chemicals Agency, ruled that the risk of electricity flowing through a LED tube during the installation stage should be avoided. This refers to a situation where one end of a LED tube is connected to the luminaire and the other, free end becomes energized. The ruling resulted in numerous sales bans and product recalls. Products complying with 1st generation electrical connection are still available on the market.
2nd generation of Retro-Fit LED tubes
The second generation of LED tubes became commonplace (especially in Nordic countries) immediately after the safety ruling of 2010. In second-generation LED tubes, the risk of installation-related electric shocks that plagued the 1st generation was resolved by a new type of electrical connection. The connection differs from that of the 1st generation by that it utilises the starter wire present in luminaires for the conveyance of electricity through the luminaire to the other end of the tube. In most cases, the solution replaces the starter by a special LED starter that short-circuits the starter branch.
3rd generation of Retro-Fit LED tubes
The so-called 3rd generation LED tubes currently on the market resolve the insufficient luminosity problem characteristic to their 1st and 2nd generation counterparts. Since the light emitted by LED tubes is beam-like, the performance (measured in lx) of LED tubes as compared to fluorescent lamps of comparable size has also significantly depended on luminaire placement and optics. Some luminaire frames reflect the light emitted from a fluorescent lamp upwards and to the sides quite well, while others waste almost all but the light emitted downwards. Especially 1st and 2nd generation LED tubes of lesser luminous power failed to match the performance of fluorescent lamps if the luminaire included wide optics with good reflecting characteristics and only accommodated a single fluorescent/LED tube. Such luminaires are capable of maximizing redirection of the light emitted from a fluorescent lamp upwards and to the sides back into the room. In case of 3rd generation LED tubes, efforts have been made to solve this problem by increasing their luminous power, so that it would be sufficient under any circumstances, regardless of the luminaire. As a result, however, the tube surface brightness surpasses that of fluorescent lamps, and in some cases, individual bright LED components can have a disturbing effect. Today, several manufacturers offer 3rd generation LED tubes, but the excessive luminous power is generally accompanied by increased electricity consumption.
4th generation of Retro-Fit LED tubes
The 4th generation of LED tubes focuses on solving well-being related issues of general lighting. Recently, several studies aimed at flickering of electric lights have been conducted. According to these studies, the flickering of traditional fluorescent lamps can cause brain stress and anxiety. The 4th generation of LED tubes offers a solution to the flickering problem. The flickering is measured using so-called flicker index or flicker percentage value. Elimination of flickering allows high-quality video recording and slow motion capture, as well as certain machine vision applications in premises equipped with flicker-free lights.

== Technology ==
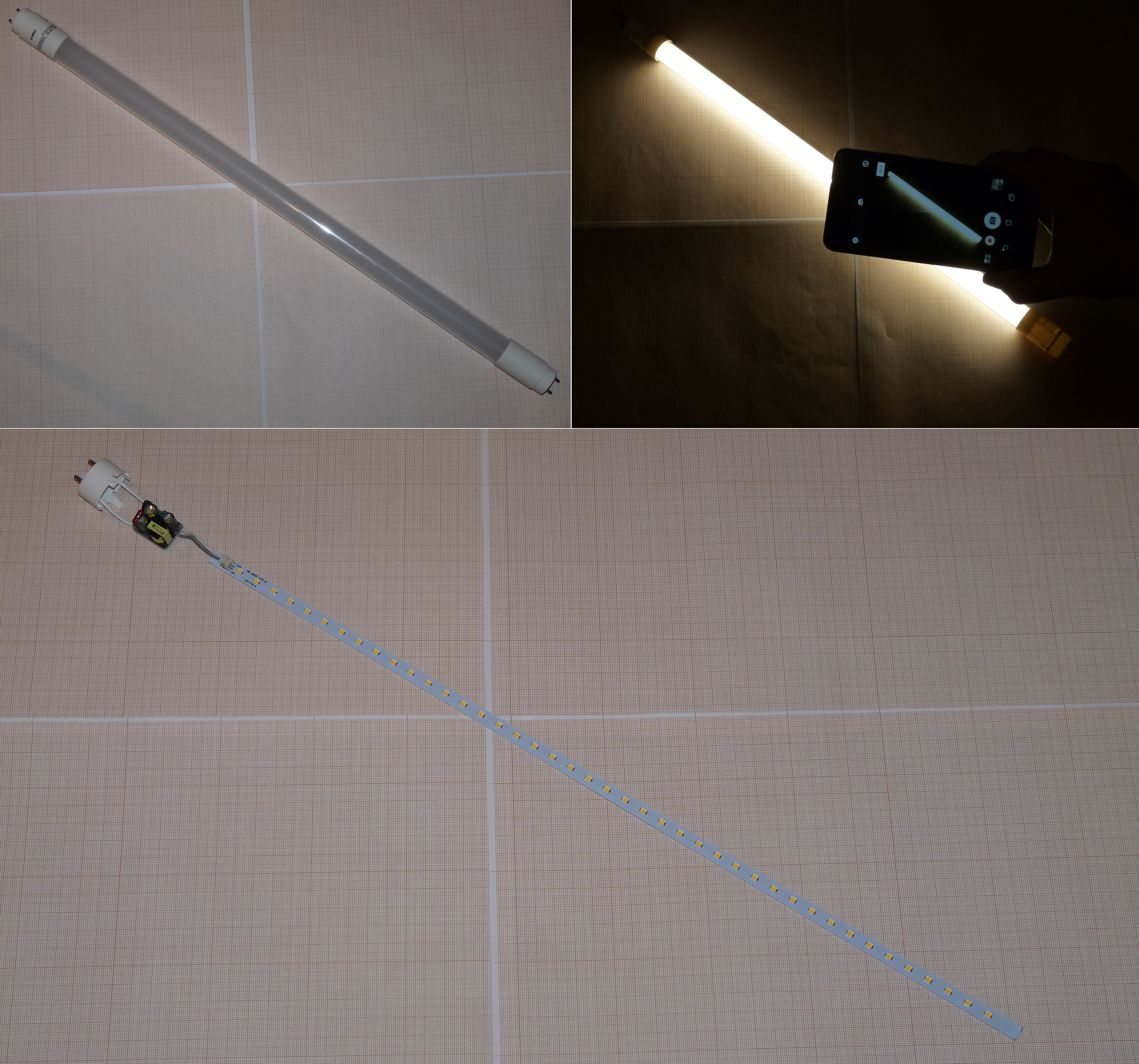
10-watt LED tube with G13/T8 socket

LED tubes are usually produced using a large number of low or medium-power LEDs. With the help of these, light output and heat conduction are balanced out across the entire tube length. The operating temperature of LED tubes is lower as compared to traditional lighting technologies, and a LED tube produces less heat than traditional fluorescent lamps.

Among the most important properties of LED tubes is the possibility of light direction – the entire luminous power of a LED tube can be directed in a narrower beam to wherever the light is required. Owing to the directivity and good luminous efficacy, LED tubes provide illuminance equal to that of other lighting technologies at lower electric power consumption.

LED tubes are typically made of durable plastic and aluminium, which means that they will not shatter.

The technical development of LED tubes has been fast throughout their entire marketing period. Luminous efficacy has reached even 150lm/w.

Similarly to other retrofit light sources, a LED tube requires control gear to function. In general, the control gear is integrated into the LED tube, but it can also be located outside the actual light source.

== Applications ==
LED tubes can be used for general lighting purposes at all locations, with the exception of locations where both upwards and downwards lighting is required. These include, for example, office luminaires suspended from the ceiling and emitting light upwards and downwards.

At present, LED tubes are mainly used in premises where the lights need to be on a lot. In such cases, the lighting-related power consumption savings will quickly offset the more expensive acquisition price. Typical applications include industrial production premises, public premises, stores, warehouses, parking garages, and refrigeration rooms/equipment. Furthermore, at premises where light source installation is complicated and expensive, LED tubes should be preferred owing to their longer service life and installation cost savings. LED tubes are also an excellent choice to accompany motion detectors, since they light up and go out immediately, and the number of On/Off switchings has less impact on LED tube service life, compared to that of fluorescent tubes.

== Colour temperatures ==
LED tubes are available with colour temperatures comparable to those of other lighting technologies. However, colder colour temperatures are more favourable in case of the LED technology. The warmer is the light achieved by the LED technology, the more are the benefits characteristic to the technology sacrificed (luminous power, for example).

== Advantages ==
Basic diagram, LED tube and Fluorescent lamp.

=== Easy maintenance ===
In principle, anyone can replace a LED tube. In case of products based on the Retro-Fit installation approach, LED tubes contain all the electronics required, which means that in the event of LED tube failure, replacement or even fluorescent tube reinstallation is simple.

=== Electricity consumption ===
As compared to T8 fluorescent lamp technology, LED tubes can reduce electricity consumption by more than 50%. Installation and maintenance cost savings can also be expected, since the service life of LED tubes is typically 3-5 times longer than that of fluorescent lamps.

LED tubes constitute an excellent choice for cold room lighting, since the reduced heat generation allows additional savings through reduced refrigeration-related energy consumption.

=== Recyclability ===
At the end of their life cycle, LED tubes must be disposed of as recyclable waste electrical and electronic equipment, and the product manufacturer/importer is required to take care of recycling arrangement. In most cases, recycling service arrangement is outsourced to a nationwide operator and collection points are available at most localities. Manufacturer/importer-specific differences are possible in the arrangements. As opposed to fluorescent lamps, mercury or heavy metals are generally not used in LED tubes.

=== Service life ===
The service life of LED tubes depends on the mechanical design, quality of LED components, implemented heat management, and quality of other electronic components used. According to the manufacturers, in favourable conditions, the service life of LED components can be up to 100,000…300,000 hours. In case of many LED tubes available on the market, the actual service life is shorter, due to the poor quality of electronic components used. In addition to product design, materials used, and assembly, the service life also significantly depends on the operating temperature and usage periods. If a LED tube is allowed to cool between usage periods, this is likely to have a positive effect on the service life. The service life is also longer in cold rooms, whereas in case of higher temperatures, the LED components lose their illumination efficiency faster and the electronics failure rate increases. Of course, the manufacturers have been unable to conduct absolute service life tests so far, since testing the products continuously for 100,000 hours would take more than 11 years.

== Challenges ==
LED tubes are among the first LED lamp types for which an international harmonized standard has been established (IEC/EN 62776). The International Electrotechnical Commission (IEC) completed the standardisation process on 11 December 2014. The standardisation process created the preconditions for the manufacture of LED tubes compatible with traditional T8 fluorescent lamps. The standard also defines the properties of LED tubes, in order to ensure mutual compatibility and user safety. However, non-compliant LED tube products are still available on the market, in the case of which insufficient attention has been paid to safety. For example, the installation-related electric shock hazard addressed earlier by TUKES (The Finnish Safety and Chemicals Agency) still exists in case of some products on the market. The CE marking does not guarantee safety.

== Sources ==
- LED tube-related guidelines published by TUKES on 28 April 2014. (Tukes = The Finnish Safety and Chemicals Agency supervises and promotes the technical safety and conformity, together with the consumer and chemicals safety in Finland.)
- IEC-62776 Standard: Double-capped LED lamps designed to retrofit linear fluorescent lamps - Safety Specifications
- Poplawski, M.E. & Miller N.M. Flicker in Solid-State Lighting: Measurement Techniques, and Proposed Reporting and Application Criteria, 2013
- 1789-2015 - IEEE Recommended Practices for Modulating Current in High-Brightness LEDs for Mitigating Health Risks to Viewers Archived 2024-09-12 at the Wayback Machine
- Hur påverkas vi av flimmer och osynliga ljusmodulationer?, Ljuskultur 5/2013 Archived 2018-01-27 at the Wayback Machine
- Proper driver design eliminates LED light strobe flicker, LED’s Magazine 04/2014 Archived 2021-12-07 at the Wayback Machine
- Understand the lighting flicker frustration, LED’s Magazine 11-12/2015
- Chart the course of energy-efficient SSL through lighting regulations, LED’s Magazine 10/2015 Archived 2015-12-26 at the Wayback Machine
- LED tubes of twelve major brands reviewed by LuxReview: Valtavalo's flicker free G4 LED tube was a great success Archived 2020-09-20 at the Wayback Machine
