= Artcraft =

Artcraft may refer to:

- Artcraft Fluorescent Lighting Corporation, American mass manufacturer of fluorescent lighting fixtures (1940–2002)
- Artcraft (typeface), typeface engraved in 1912 by Robert Wiebking
- Artcraft Pictures, defunct American film production company
- Artcraft Theatre, movie theater in Franklin, Indiana
- ArtCraft (software), a suite of open-source creative and office applications
