= Fayaz Ahmad Jan =

Indian papier-mâché artisan

Fayaz Ahmad Jan is an Indian papier-mâché artisan, who was awarded the Padma Shri (2019), the fourth highest civilian award in India for his work in artcraft and papier-mâché. Fayaz has participated in various workshops, held in the United States, Brazil, France, Sweden, Italy, Singapore, Oman, Dubai, Iran and Kyrgyzstan. He hails from Hassanabad of Srinagar district, Kashmir.

== See also ==
- List of Padma Shri award recipients (2010–2019)
