= Fluorescent lamp =

Lamp using fluorescence to produce light

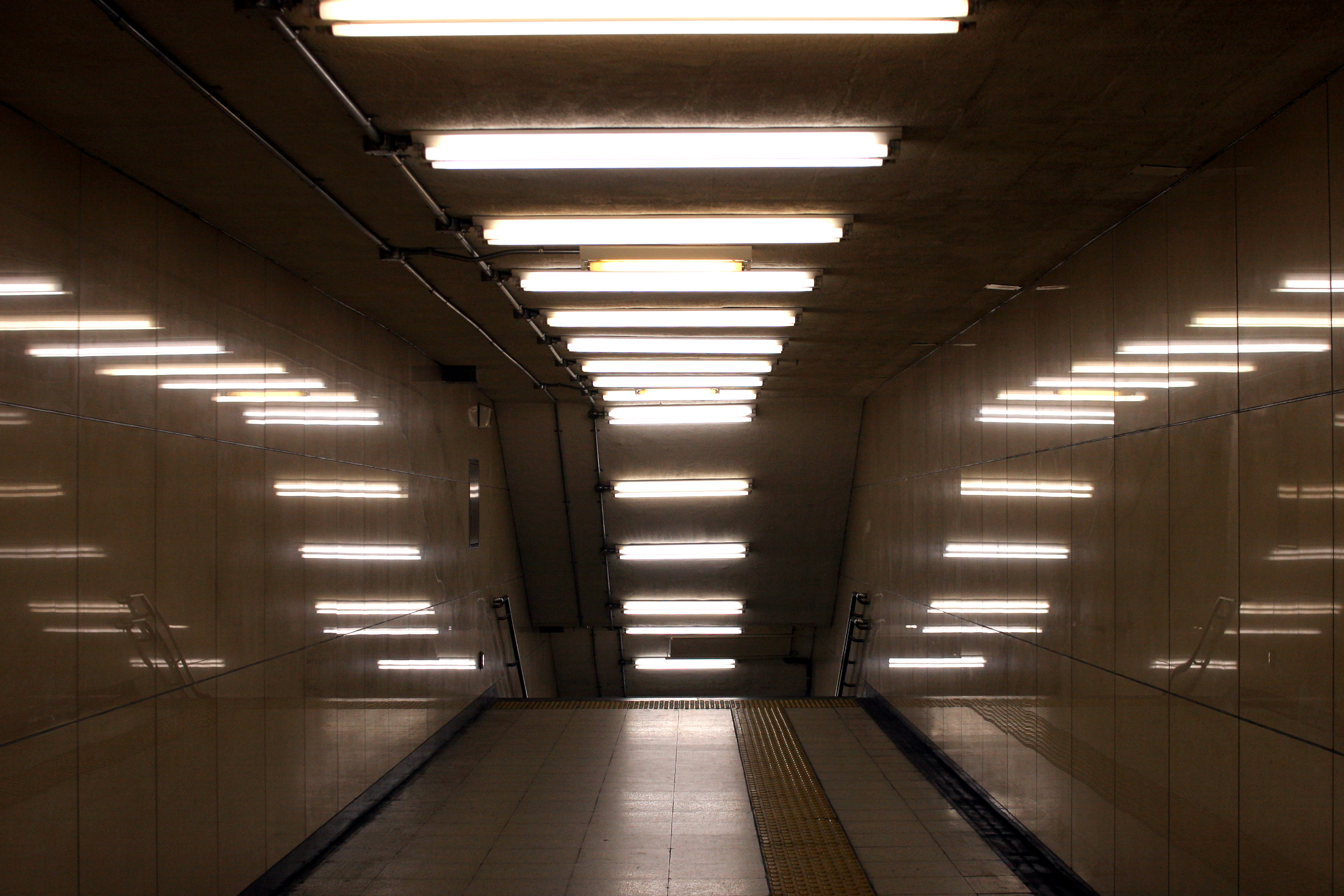
Linear fluorescent lamps illuminating a pedestrian tunnel

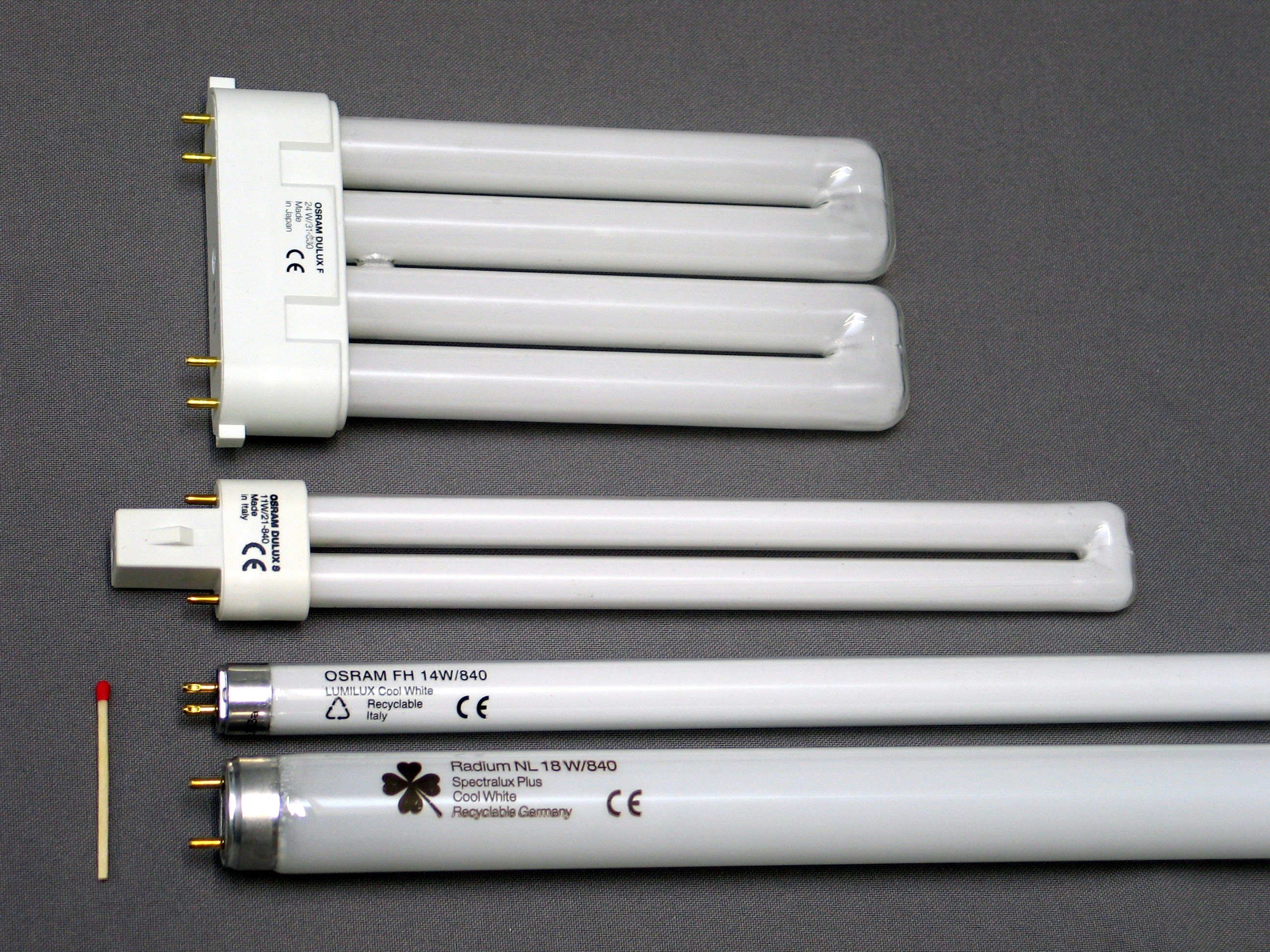
Top: two non-integrated compact fluorescent lamps. Bottom: two fluorescent tube lamps. Both types require a ballast in the light fixture. A matchstick, left, is shown for scale.

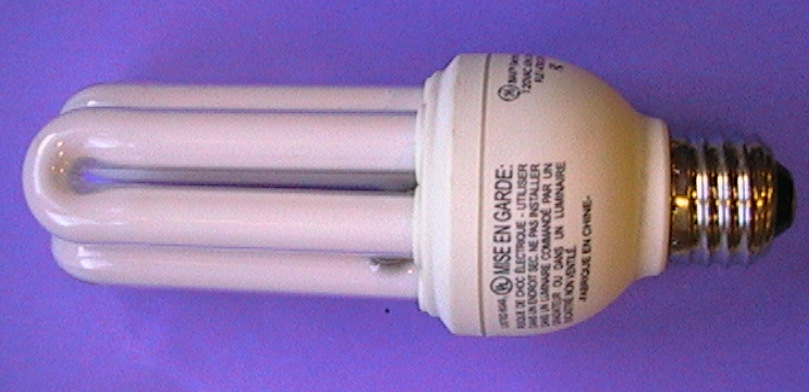
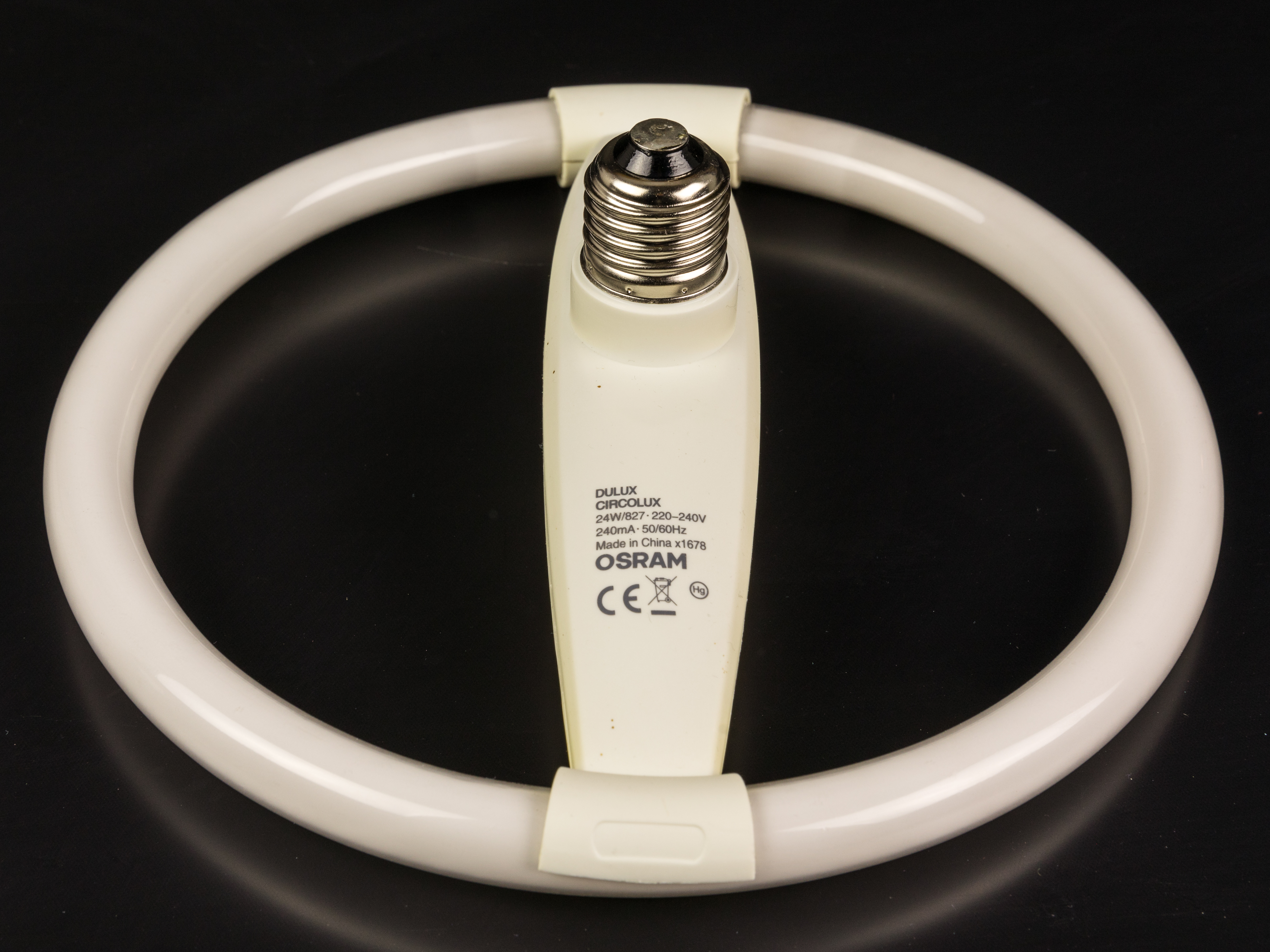
Integrated compact fluorescent lamps of different shapes with E27 socket and an electronic ballast in the base

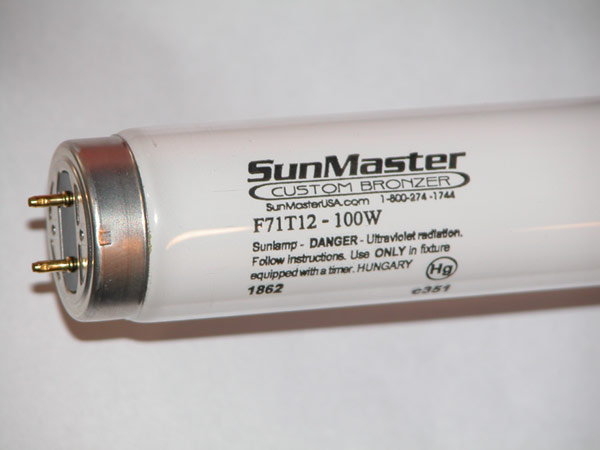
Typical F71T12 100 W G13 bi-pin lamp used in tanning beds. The (Hg) symbol indicates that this lamp contains mercury. In the US, this symbol is now required on all mercury-containing fluorescent lamps.

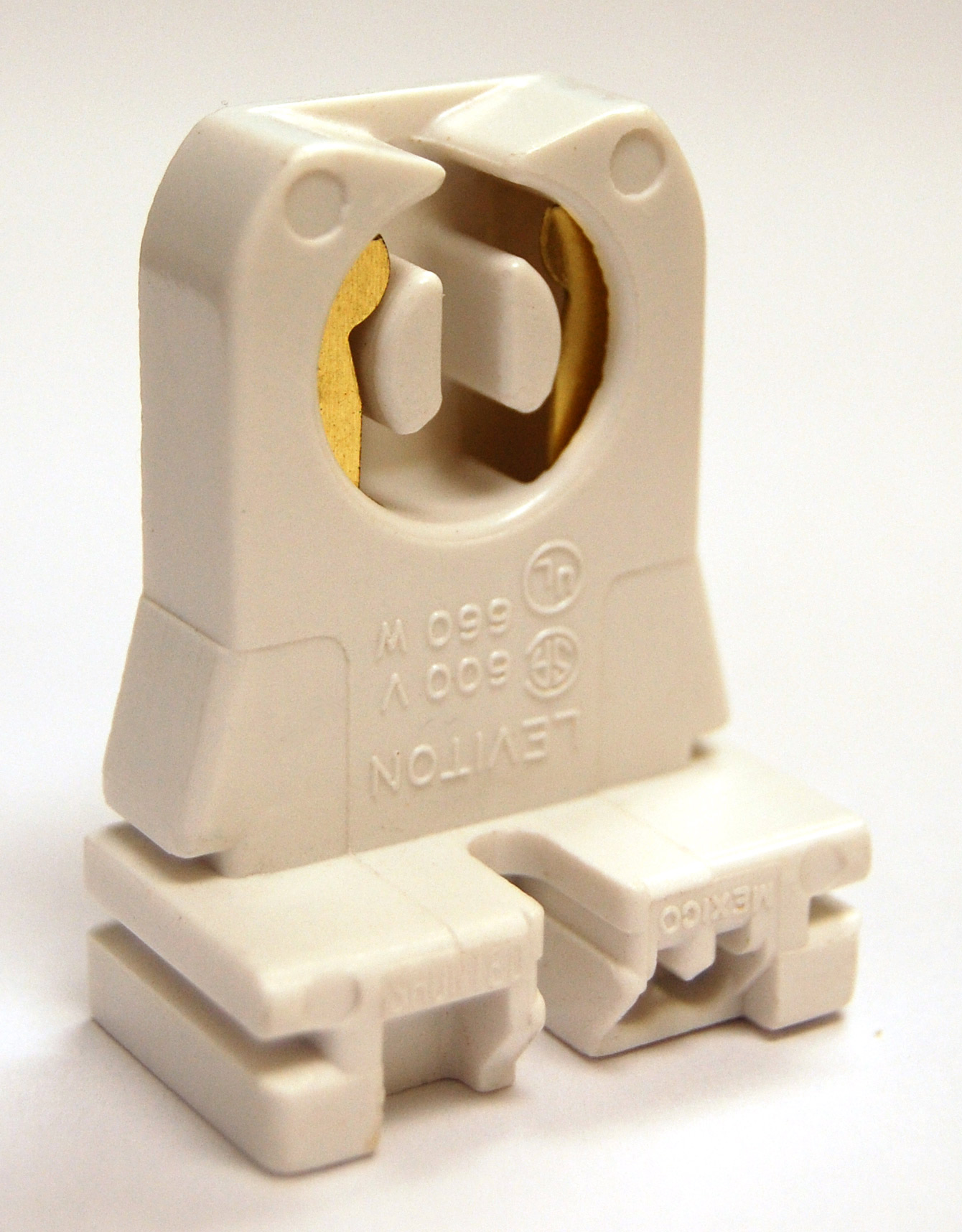
A "tombstone" style lamp-holder for T12 and T8 G13 bi-pin fluorescent lamps

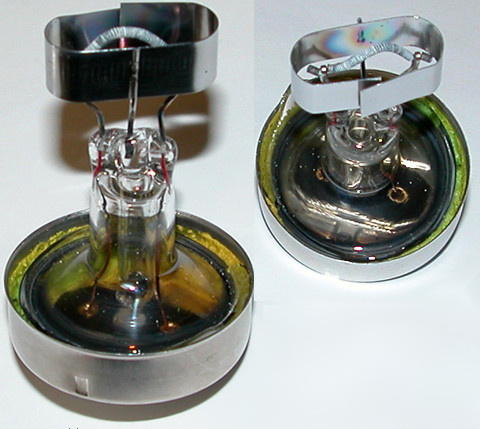
Inside the lamp end of a preheat G13 lamp. In this lamp, the filament is surrounded by an oblong metal cathode shield, which helps reduce lamp end darkening.

A fluorescent lamp, or fluorescent tube, is a low-pressure mercury-vapor gas-discharge lamp that uses fluorescence to produce visible light. An electric current in the gas excites mercury vapor, to produce ultraviolet and make a phosphor coating in the lamp glow. Fluorescent lamps convert electrical energy into visible light much more efficiently than incandescent lamps, but are still less efficient than most LED lamps. The typical luminous efficacy of fluorescent lamps is 50–100 lumens per watt, several times the efficacy of general lighting incandescent bulbs with comparable light output, which is on the close order of 16 lm/W.

Fluorescent lamp fixtures are more costly than incandescent lamps because, among other things, they require a ballast to regulate current through the lamp, but the initial cost is offset by a much lower running cost. Compact fluorescent lamps (CFL) made in the same sizes as incandescent lamp bulbs are used as an energy-saving alternative to incandescent lamps in homes.

In the United States, fluorescent lamps are classified as universal waste (a category of hazardous waste). The United States Environmental Protection Agency recommends that fluorescent lamps be segregated from general waste for recycling or safe disposal, and some jurisdictions require recycling of them.

== History ==
=== Physical discoveries ===
==== Fluorescence ====
The fluorescence of certain rocks and other substances had been observed for hundreds of years before its nature was understood. One of the first to explain it was Irish scientist Sir George Stokes from the University of Cambridge in 1852, who named the phenomenon "fluorescence" after the mineral fluorite, many samples of which glow strongly because of impurities.

==== Discharge tubes ====
By mid-19th century, experimenters had observed a radiant glow emanating from partially evacuated glass vessels through which an electric current passed. The explanation relied on the nature of electricity and light phenomena as developed by the British scientists Michael Faraday in the 1840s and James Clerk Maxwell in the 1860s.

Little more was done with this phenomenon until 1856 when German glassblower Heinrich Geissler created a mercury vacuum pump that evacuated a glass tube to an extent not previously possible. Geissler invented the first gas-discharge lamp, the Geissler tube, consisting of a partially evacuated glass tube with a metal electrode at either end. When a high voltage was applied between the electrodes, the inside of the tube illuminated with a glow discharge. By putting different chemicals inside, the tubes could be made to produce a variety of colors, and elaborate Geissler tubes were sold for entertainment. More important was its contribution to scientific research. One of the first scientists to experiment with a Geissler tube was Julius Plücker, who systematically described in 1858 the luminescent effects that occurred in a Geissler tube. He also made the important observation that the glow in the tube shifted position when in proximity to an electromagnetic field. Alexandre Edmond Becquerel observed in 1859 that certain substances gave off light when they were placed in a Geissler tube. He went on to apply thin coatings of luminescent materials to the surfaces of these tubes. Fluorescence occurred, but the tubes were inefficient and had a short operating life.

Inquiries that began with the Geissler tube continued as better vacuums were produced. The most famous was the evacuated tube used for scientific research by William Crookes. That tube was evacuated by the highly effective mercury vacuum pump created by Hermann Sprengel. Research conducted by Crookes and others ultimately led to the discovery of the electron in 1897 by J. J. Thomson and X-rays in 1895 by Wilhelm Röntgen. The Crookes tube, as it came to be known, produced little light because the vacuum in it was too great and thus lacked the trace amounts of gas that are needed for electrically stimulated luminescence.

=== Early discharge lamps ===
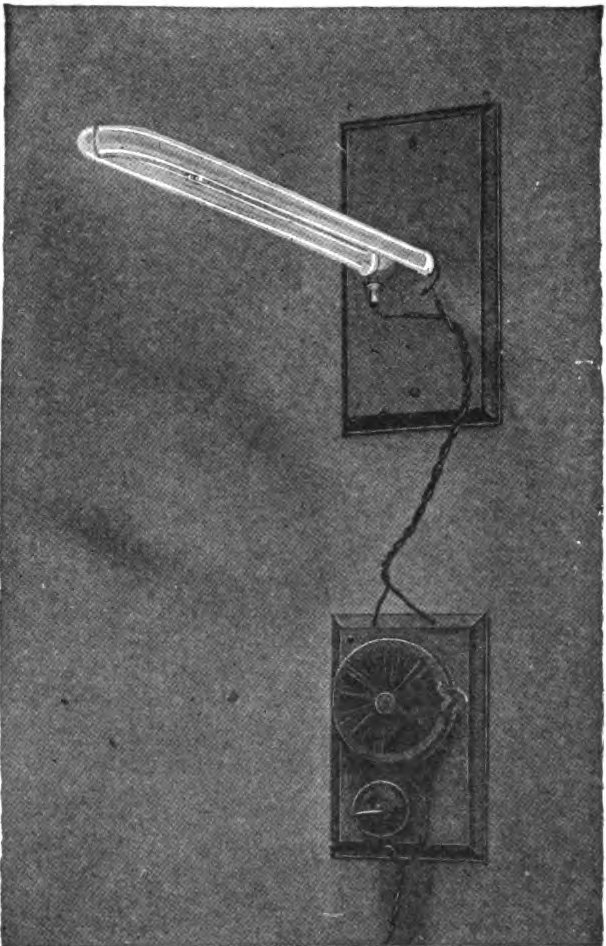
One of the first mercury vapor lamps invented by Peter Cooper Hewitt, 1903. It was similar to a fluorescent lamp without the fluorescent coating on the tube and produced greenish light. The round device under the lamp is the ballast.

Thomas Edison briefly pursued fluorescent lighting for its commercial potential. He invented a fluorescent lamp in 1896 that used a coating of calcium tungstate as the fluorescing substance, excited by X-rays. Although it received a patent in 1907, it was not put into production. As with a few other attempts to use Geissler tubes for illumination, it had a short operating life, and given the success of the incandescent light, Edison had little reason to pursue an alternative means of electrical illumination. Nikola Tesla made similar experiments in the 1890s, devising high-frequency powered fluorescent bulbs that gave a bright greenish light, but as with Edison's devices, no commercial success was achieved.

One of Edison's former employees created a gas-discharge lamp that achieved a measure of commercial success. In 1895 Daniel McFarlan Moore demonstrated lamps 2 to 3 meters (6.6 to 9.8 ft) in length that used carbon dioxide or nitrogen to emit white or pink light, respectively. They were considerably more complicated than an incandescent bulb, requiring both a high-voltage power supply and a pressure-regulating system for the fill gas.

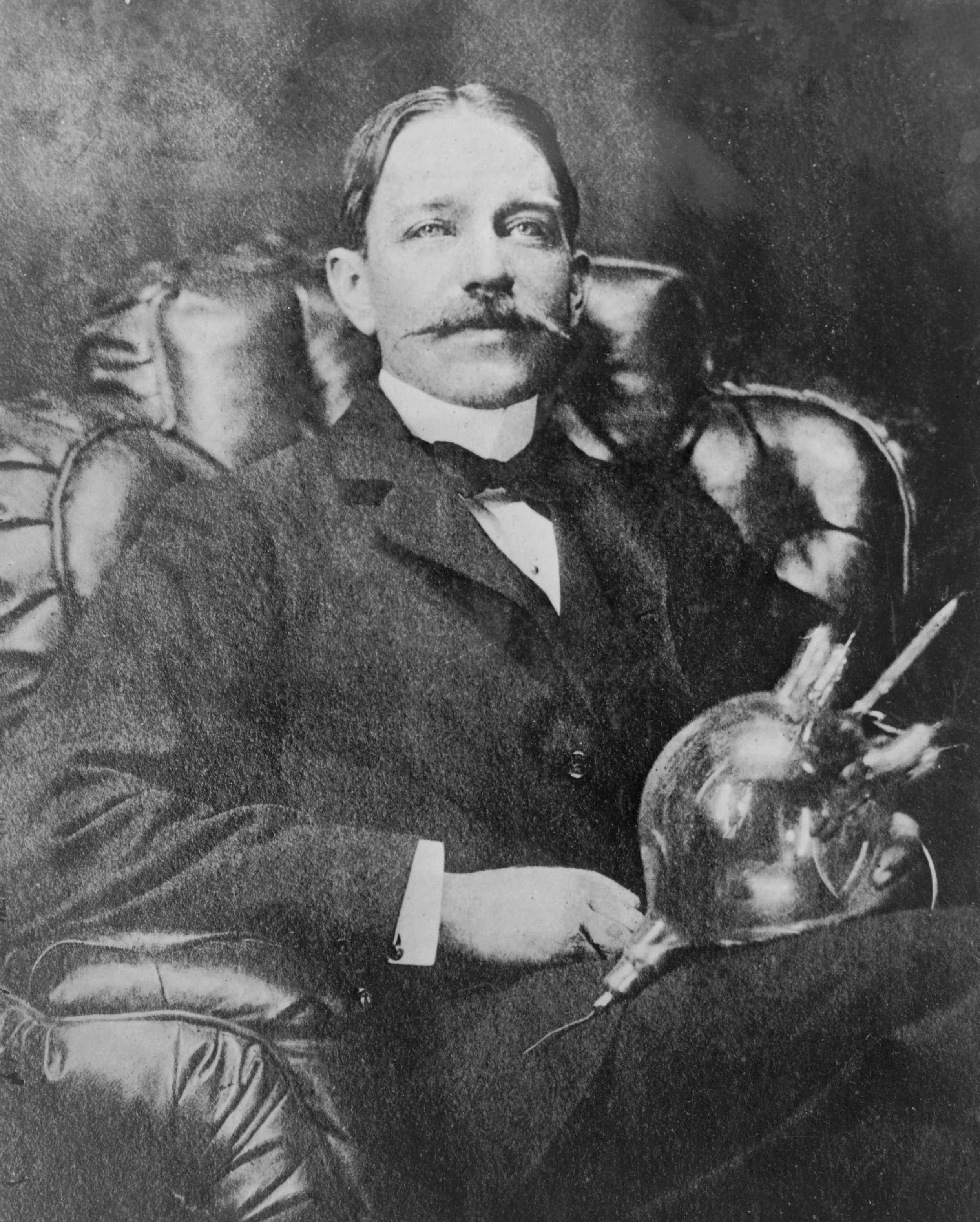
Peter Cooper Hewitt

Moore invented an electromagnetically controlled valve that maintained a constant gas pressure within the tube, to extend the working life. Although Moore's lamp was complicated, expensive, and required very high voltages, it was considerably more efficient than incandescent lamps, and it produced a closer approximation to natural daylight than contemporary incandescent lamps. From 1904 onwards Moore's lighting system was installed in a number of stores and offices. Its success contributed to General Electric's motivation to improve the incandescent lamp, especially its filament. GE's efforts came to fruition with the invention of a tungsten-based filament. The extended lifespan and improved efficacy of incandescent bulbs negated one of the key advantages of Moore's lamp, but GE purchased the relevant patents in 1912. These patents and the inventive efforts that supported them were of considerable value when the firm took up fluorescent lighting more than two decades later.

At about the same time that Moore was developing his lighting system, Peter Cooper Hewitt invented the mercury-vapor lamp, patented in 1901 (US 682692). Hewitt's lamp glowed when an electric current was passed through mercury vapor at a low pressure. Unlike Moore's lamps, Hewitt's were manufactured in standardized sizes and operated at low voltages. The mercury-vapor lamp was superior to the incandescent lamps of the time in terms of energy efficiency, but the blue-green light it produced limited its applications. It was, however, used for photography and some industrial processes.

Mercury vapor lamps continued to be developed at a slow pace, especially in Europe. By the early 1930s they received limited use for large-scale illumination. Some of them employed fluorescent coatings, but these were used primarily for color correction and not for enhanced light output. Mercury vapor lamps also anticipated the fluorescent lamp in their incorporation of a ballast to maintain a constant current.

Cooper-Hewitt had not been the first to use mercury vapor for illumination, as earlier efforts had been mounted by Way, Rapieff, Arons, and Bastian and Salisbury. Of particular importance was the mercury-vapor lamp invented by Küch and Retschinsky in Germany. The lamp used a smaller bore bulb and higher current operating at higher pressures. As a consequence of the current, the bulb operated at a higher temperature which necessitated the use of a quartz bulb. Although its light output relative to electrical consumption was better than that of other sources of light, the light it produced was similar to that of the Cooper-Hewitt lamp in that it lacked the red portion of the spectrum, making it unsuitable for ordinary lighting. Due to difficulties in sealing the electrodes to the quartz, the lamp had a short life.

=== Neon lamps ===
The next step in gas-based lighting took advantage of the luminescent qualities of neon, an inert gas that had been discovered in 1898 by isolation from the atmosphere. Neon glowed a brilliant red when used in Geissler tubes. By 1910, Georges Claude, a Frenchman who had developed a technology and a successful business for air liquefaction, was obtaining enough neon as a byproduct to support a neon lighting industry. While neon lighting was used around 1930 in France for general illumination, it was no more energy-efficient than conventional incandescent lighting. Neon tube lighting, which also includes the use of argon and mercury vapor as alternative gases, came to be used primarily for eye-catching signs and advertisements. Neon lighting was relevant to the development of fluorescent lighting, however, as Claude's improved electrode (patented in 1915) overcame "sputtering", a major source of electrode degradation. Sputtering occurred when ionized particles struck an electrode and tore off bits of metal. Although Claude's invention required electrodes with a lot of surface area, it showed that a major impediment to gas-based lighting could be overcome.

The development of the neon light also was significant for the last key element of the fluorescent lamp, its fluorescent coating. In 1926 Jacques Risler received a French patent for the application of fluorescent coatings to neon light tubes. The main use of these lamps, which can be considered the first commercially successful fluorescents, was for advertising, not general illumination. This, however, was not the first use of fluorescent coatings; Becquerel had earlier used the idea and Edison used calcium tungstate for his unsuccessful lamp. Other efforts had been mounted, but all were plagued by low efficiency and various technical problems. Of particular importance was the invention in 1927 of a low-voltage "metal vapor lamp" by Friedrich Meyer, Hans-Joachim Spanner, and Edmund Germer, who were employees of a German firm in Berlin. A German patent was granted but the lamp never went into commercial production.

=== Commercialization of fluorescent lamps ===
All the major features of fluorescent lighting were in place at the end of the 1920s. Decades of invention and development had provided the key components of fluorescent lamps: economically manufactured glass tubing, inert gases for filling the tubes, electrical ballasts, long-lasting electrodes, mercury vapor as a source of luminescence, effective means of producing a reliable electrical discharge, and fluorescent coatings that could be energized by ultraviolet light. At this point, intensive development was more important than basic research.

In 1934, Arthur Compton, a renowned physicist and GE consultant, reported to the GE lamp department on successful experiments with fluorescent lighting at General Electric Co., Ltd. in Great Britain (unrelated to General Electric in the United States). Stimulated by this report, and with all of the key elements available, a team led by George E. Inman built a prototype fluorescent lamp in 1934 at General Electric's Nela Park (Ohio) engineering laboratory. This was not a trivial exercise; as noted by Arthur A. Bright, "A great deal of experimentation had to be done on lamp sizes and shapes, cathode construction, gas pressures of both argon and mercury vapor, colors of fluorescent powders, methods of attaching them to the inside of the tube, and other details of the lamp and its auxiliaries before the new device was ready for the public."

In addition to having engineers and technicians along with facilities for R&D work on fluorescent lamps, General Electric controlled what it regarded as the key patents covering fluorescent lighting, including the patents originally issued to Hewitt, Moore, and Küch. More important than these was a patent covering an electrode that did not disintegrate at the gas pressures that ultimately were employed in fluorescent lamps. Albert W. Hull of GE's Schenectady Research Laboratory filed for a patent on this invention in 1927, which was issued in 1931. General Electric used its control of the patents to prevent competition with its incandescent lights and probably delayed the introduction of fluorescent lighting by 20 years. Eventually, war production required 24-hour factories with economical lighting, and fluorescent lights became available.

While the Hull patent gave GE a basis for claiming legal rights over the fluorescent lamp, a few months after the lamp went into production the firm learned of a U.S. patent application that had been filed in 1927 for the aforementioned "metal vapor lamp" invented in Germany by Meyer, Spanner, and Germer. The patent application indicated that the lamp had been created as a superior means of producing ultraviolet light, but the application also contained a few statements referring to fluorescent illumination. Efforts to obtain a U.S. patent had met with numerous delays, but were it to be granted, the patent might have caused serious difficulties for GE. At first, GE sought to block the issuance of a patent by claiming that priority should go to one of their employees, Leroy J. Buttolph, who according to their claim had invented a fluorescent lamp in 1919 and whose patent application was still pending. GE also had filed a patent application in 1936 in Inman's name to cover the "improvements" wrought by his group. In 1939 GE decided that the claim of Meyer, Spanner, and Germer had some merit, and that in any event a long interference procedure was not in their best interest. They therefore dropped the Buttolph claim and paid $180,000 to acquire the Meyer, et al. application, which at that point was owned by a firm known as Electrons, Inc. The patent was duly awarded in December 1939. This patent, along with the Hull patent, put GE on what seemed to be firm legal ground, although it faced years of legal challenges from Sylvania Electric Products, Inc., which claimed infringement on patents that it held.

Even though the patent issue was not completely resolved for many years, General Electric's strength in manufacturing and marketing gave it a pre-eminent position in the emerging fluorescent light market. Sales of "fluorescent lumiline lamps" commenced in 1938 when four different sizes of tubes were put on the market. They were used in fixtures manufactured by three leading corporations: Lightolier, Artcraft Fluorescent Lighting Corporation, and Globe Lighting. The Slimline fluorescent ballast's public introduction in 1946 was by Westinghouse and General Electric and Showcase/Display Case fixtures were introduced by Artcraft Fluorescent Lighting Corporation in 1946. During the following year, GE and Westinghouse publicized the new lights through exhibitions at the New York World's Fair and the Golden Gate International Exposition in San Francisco. Fluorescent lighting systems spread rapidly during World War II as wartime manufacturing intensified lighting demand. By 1951 more light was produced in the United States by fluorescent lamps than by incandescent lamps.

In the first years zinc orthosilicate with varying content of beryllium was used as greenish phosphor. Small additions of magnesium tungstate improved the blue portion of the spectrum, yielding acceptable white. After the discovery that beryllium was toxic, halophosphate-based phosphors dominated.

== Principles of operation ==
The fundamental mechanism for the conversion of electrical energy to light is the emission of a photon when an electron in a mercury atom falls from an excited state into a lower energy level. Electrons flowing in the arc collide with the mercury atoms. If the incident electron has enough kinetic energy, it transfers energy to the atom's outer electron, causing that electron to temporarily jump up to a higher energy level that is not stable. The atom will emit a photon as the atom's electron reverts to a lower, more stable, energy level. Most of the photons that are released from the mercury atoms have wavelengths in the ultraviolet (UV) region of the spectrum, predominantly at wavelengths of 253.7 and 185 nanometers (nm). These are not visible to the human eye, so ultraviolet energy is converted to visible light by the fluorescence of the inner phosphor coating. The difference in energy between the absorbed ultra-violet photon and the emitted visible light photon heats the phosphor coating.

Electric current flows through the tube in a low-pressure arc discharge. Electrons collide with and ionize noble gas atoms inside the bulb surrounding the filament to form a plasma by the process of impact ionization. As a result of avalanche ionization, the conductivity of the ionized gas rapidly rises, allowing higher currents to flow through the lamp.

The fill gas helps determine the electrical characteristics of the lamp but does not give off light itself. The fill gas effectively increases the distance that electrons travel through the tube, which allows an electron a greater chance of interacting with a mercury atom. Additionally, argon atoms, excited to a metastable state by the impact of an electron, can impart energy to a mercury atom and ionize it, described as the Penning effect. This lowers the breakdown and operating voltage of the lamp, compared to other possible fill gases such as krypton.

=== Construction ===
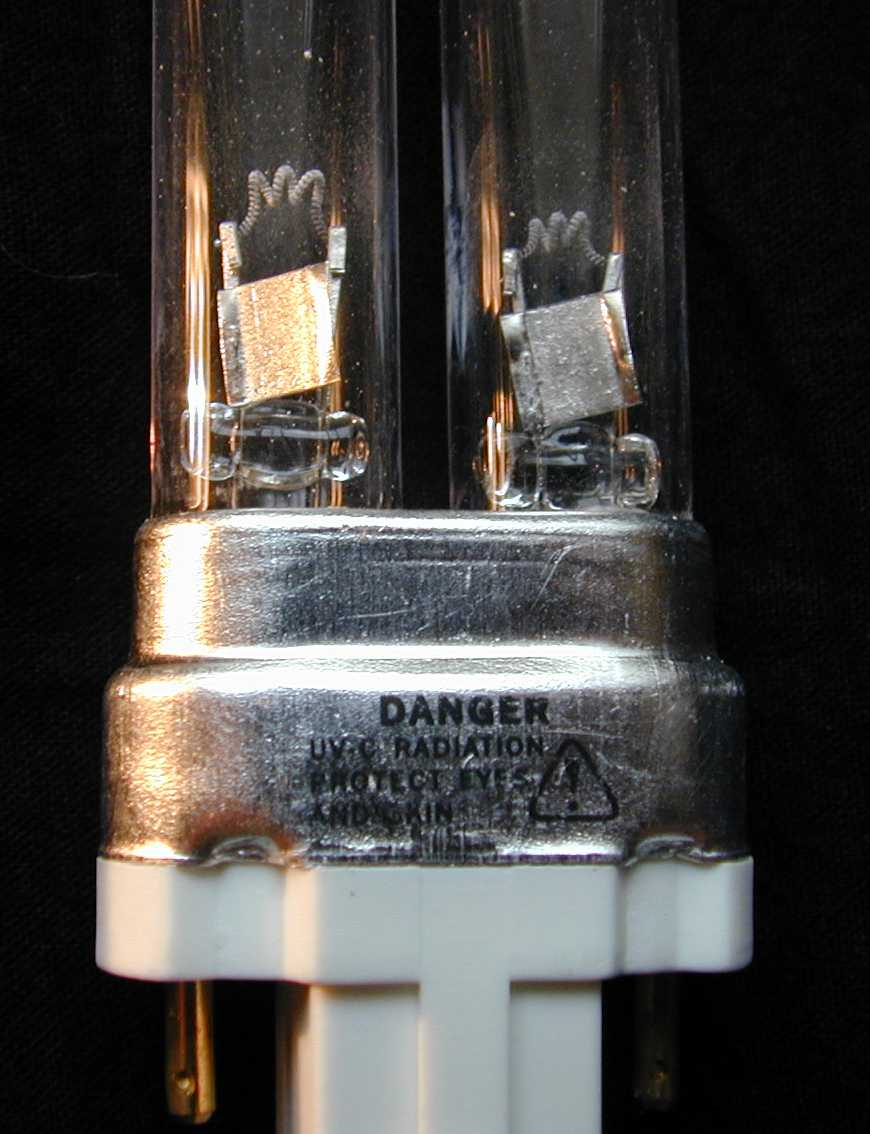
Close-up of the cathodes of a germicidal lamp (an essentially similar design that uses no fluorescent phosphor, allowing the electrodes to be seen)

A fluorescent lamp tube is filled with a mix of argon, xenon, neon, or krypton, and mercury vapor. The pressure inside the lamp is around 0.3% of atmospheric pressure. The partial pressure of the mercury vapor alone is about 0.8 Pa (8 millionths of atmospheric pressure), in a T12 40-watt lamp. The inner surface of the lamp is coated with a fluorescent coating made of varying blends of metallic and rare-earth phosphor salts. The lamp's electrodes are typically made of coiled tungsten and are coated with a mixture of barium, strontium and calcium oxides to improve thermionic emission.

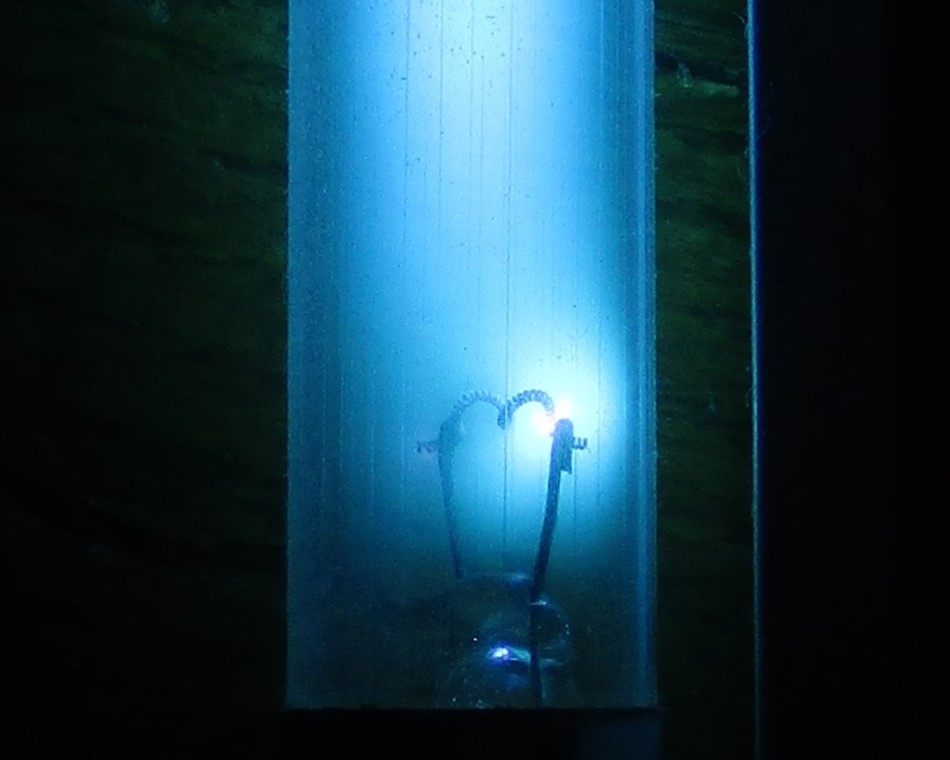
A germicidal lamp uses a low-pressure mercury-vapor arc discharge identical to that in a fluorescent lamp, but the uncoated fused quartz envelope allows ultraviolet radiation to transmit.

Fluorescent lamp tubes are often straight and range in length from about 100 millimeters (3.9 in) for miniature lamps, to 2.43 meters (8.0 ft) for high-output lamps. Some lamps have a circular tube, used for table lamps or other places where a more compact light source is desired. Larger U-shaped lamps are used to provide the same amount of light in a more compact area, and are used for special architectural purposes. Compact fluorescent lamps have several small-diameter tubes joined in a bundle of two, four, or six, or a small diameter tube coiled in a helix, to provide a high amount of light output in minimal volume.

Light-emitting phosphors are applied as a paint-like coating to the inside of the tube. The organic solvents are allowed to evaporate, then the tube is heated to nearly the melting point of glass to drive off remaining organic compounds and fuse the coating to the lamp tube. Careful control of the grain size of the suspended phosphors is necessary; large grains lead to weak coatings, and small particles lead to poor light maintenance and efficiency. Most phosphors perform best with a particle size around 10 micrometers. The coating must be thick enough to capture all the ultraviolet light produced by the mercury arc, but not so thick that the phosphor coating absorbs too much visible light. The first phosphors were synthetic versions of naturally occurring fluorescent minerals, with small amounts of metals added as activators. Later other compounds were discovered, allowing differing colors of lamps to be made.

Fluorescent tubes can have an outer silicone coating applied by dipping the tube into a solution of water and silicone, and then drying the tube. This coating gives the tube a silky surface finish, and protects against moisture, guaranteeing a predictable surface resistance on the tube when starting it.

=== Ballasts ===
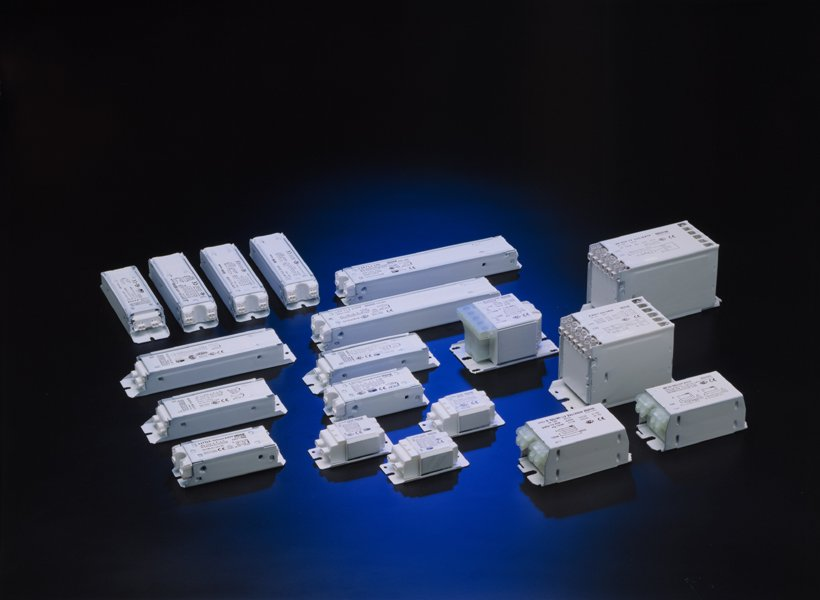
Different ballasts for fluorescent and discharge lamps

Fluorescent lamps are negative differential resistance devices, so as more current flows through them, the electrical resistance of the fluorescent lamp drops, allowing for even more current to flow. Connected directly to a constant-voltage power supply, a fluorescent lamp would rapidly self-destruct because of the uncontrolled current flow. To prevent this, fluorescent lamps must use a ballast to regulate the current flow through the lamp.

The terminal voltage across an operating lamp varies depending on the arc current, tube diameter, temperature, and fill gas. A general lighting service 48-inch (1,219 mm) T12 lamp operates at 430 mA, with 100 volts drop. High-output lamps operate at 800 mA, and some types operate up to 1.5 A. The power level varies from 33 to 82 watts per meter of tube length (10 to 25 W/ft) for T12 lamps.

The simplest ballast for alternating current (AC) use is an inductor placed in series, consisting of a winding on a laminated magnetic core. The inductance of this winding limits the flow of AC current. This type of ballast is common in 220–240V countries (and in North America, up to 30W lamps). Ballasts are rated for the size of lamp and power frequency. In North America, the AC voltage is insufficient to start long fluorescent lamps, so the ballast is often a step-up autotransformer with substantial leakage inductance (to limit current flow). Either form of inductive ballast may also include a capacitor for power factor correction.

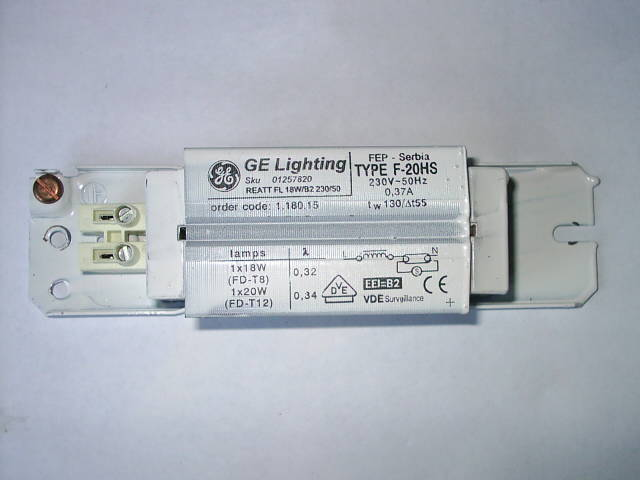
230 V ballast for 18–20 W

Fluorescent lamps can run directly from a direct current (DC) supply of sufficient voltage to strike an arc. The ballast must be resistive, and would consume about as much power as the lamp. When operated from DC, the starting switch is often arranged to reverse the polarity of the supply to the lamp each time it is started; otherwise, the mercury accumulates at one end of the tube. Fluorescent lamps are (almost) never operated directly from DC for those reasons. Instead, an inverter converts the DC into AC and provides the current-limiting function as described below for electronic ballasts.

=== Effect of temperature ===
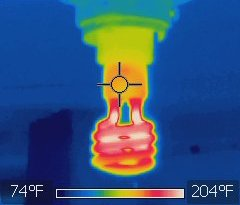
Thermal image of a helical fluorescent lamp

The performance of fluorescent lamps is critically affected by the temperature of the bulb wall and its effect on the partial pressure of the mercury vapor within. Since mercury condenses at the coolest spot in the lamp, careful design is required to maintain that spot at the optimum temperature, around 40 °C (104 °F).

Using an amalgam with some other metal reduces the vapor pressure and increases the optimum temperature range. The bulb wall "cold spot" temperature must still be controlled to prevent condensing. High-output fluorescent lamps have features such as a deformed tube or internal heat-sinks to control cold spot temperature and mercury distribution. Heavily loaded small lamps, such as compact fluorescent lamps, also include heat-sink areas in the tube to maintain mercury vapor pressure at the optimum value.

=== Losses ===
A Sankey diagram of energy losses in a fluorescent lamp. In modern designs, the biggest loss is the quantum efficiency of converting high-energy UV photons to lower-energy visible light photons.

Only a fraction of the electrical energy input into a lamp is converted to visible light. The ballast dissipates some heat; electronic ballasts may be around 90% efficient. A fixed voltage drop occurs at the electrodes, which also produces heat. Some of the energy in the mercury vapor column is also dissipated, but about 85% is turned into visible and ultraviolet light.

Not all the UV radiation striking the phosphor coating is converted to visible light; some energy is lost. The largest single loss in modern lamps is due to the lower energy of each photon of visible light, compared to the energy of the UV photons that generated them (a phenomenon called Stokes shift). Incident photons have an energy of 5.5 electron volts but produce visible light photons with energy around 2.5 electron volts, so only 45% of the UV energy is used; the rest is dissipated as heat.

=== Cold-cathode fluorescent lamps ===
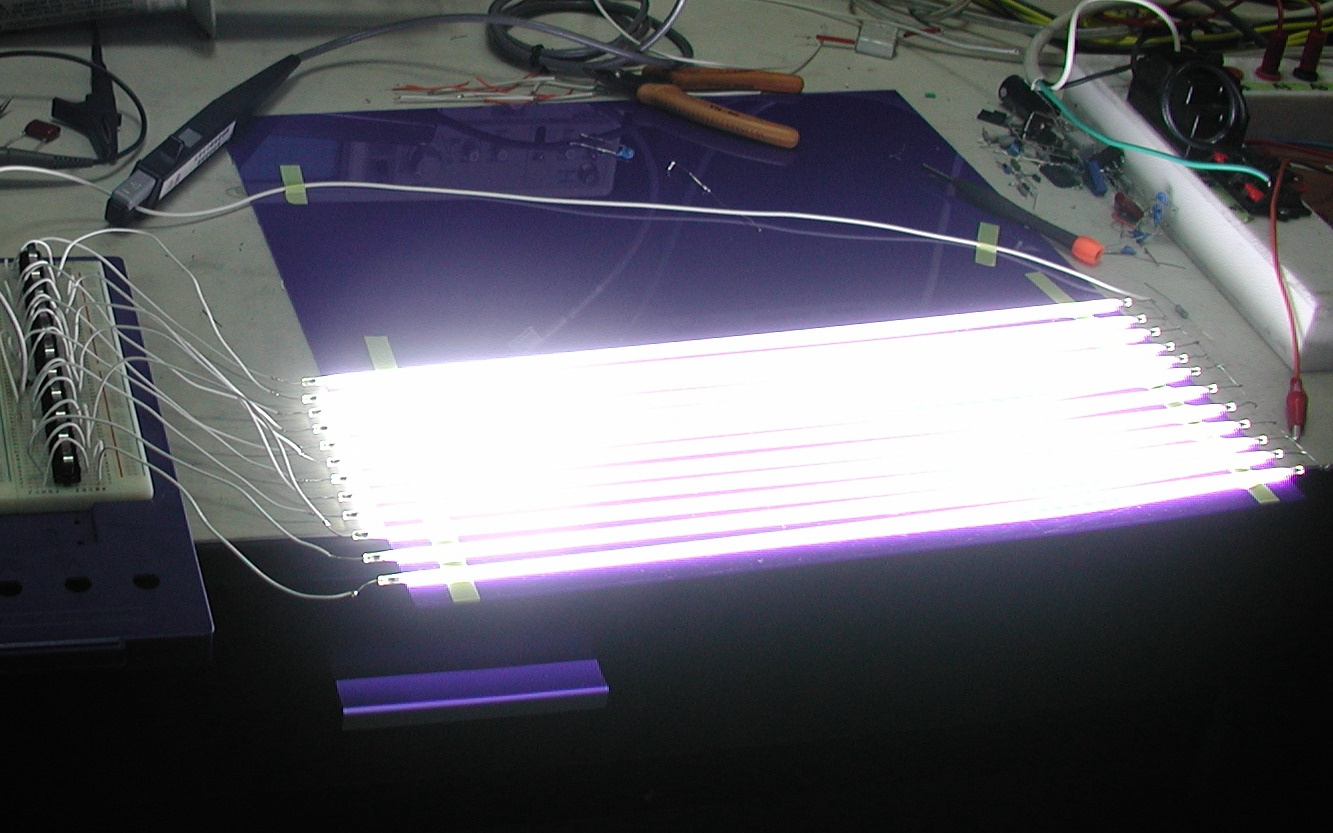
A cold-cathode fluorescent lamp from an emergency-exit sign. Operating at a much higher voltage than other fluorescents, the lamp produces a low-amperage glow discharge rather than an arc, similar to a neon light. Without direct connection to line voltage, current is limited by the transformer alone, negating the need for a ballast.

Most fluorescent lamps use electrodes that emit electrons into the tube by heat, known as hot cathodes. However, cold cathode tubes have cathodes that emit electrons only due to the large voltage between the electrodes. The cathodes will be warmed by current flowing through them, but are not hot enough for significant thermionic emission. Because cold cathode lamps have no thermionic emission coating to wear out, they can have much longer lives than hot cathode tubes. This makes them desirable for long-life applications (such as backlights in liquid crystal displays). Sputtering of the electrode may still occur, but electrodes can be shaped (e.g. into an internal cylinder) to capture most of the sputtered material so it is not lost from the electrode.

Cold cathode lamps are generally less efficient than thermionic emission lamps because the cathode fall voltage is much higher. Power dissipated due to cathode fall voltage does not contribute to light output. However, this is less significant with longer tubes. The increased power dissipation at tube ends also usually means cold cathode tubes have to be run at a lower loading than their thermionic emission equivalents. Given the higher tube voltage required anyway, these tubes can easily be made long, and even run as series strings. They are better suited for bending into special shapes for lettering and signage, and can also be instantly switched on or off.

=== Starting ===
The gas used in the fluorescent tube must be ionized before the arc can "strike" . For small lamps, it does not take much voltage to strike the arc and starting the lamp presents no problem, but larger tubes require a substantial voltage (in the range of a thousand volts). Many different starting circuits have been used. The choice of circuit is based on cost, AC voltage, tube length, instant versus non-instant starting, temperature ranges and parts availability.

==== Preheating ====
A preheat fluorescent lamp circuit using an automatic starting switch. A: Fluorescent tube, B: Power (+220 volts), C: Starter, D: Switch (bi-metallic thermostat), E: Capacitor, F: Filaments, G: Ballast

Starting a preheat lamp. The automatic starter switch flashes orange each time it attempts to start the lamp.

Preheating, also called switchstart, uses a combination filament–cathode at each end of the lamp in conjunction with a mechanical or automatic (bi-metallic) switch (see circuit diagram to the right) that initially connect the filaments in series with the ballast to preheat them; after a short preheating time the starting switch opens. If timed correctly relative to the phase of the supply AC, this causes the ballast to induce a voltage over the tube high enough to initiate the starting arc. These systems are standard equipment in 200–240 V countries (and in the United States lamps up to about 30 watts).

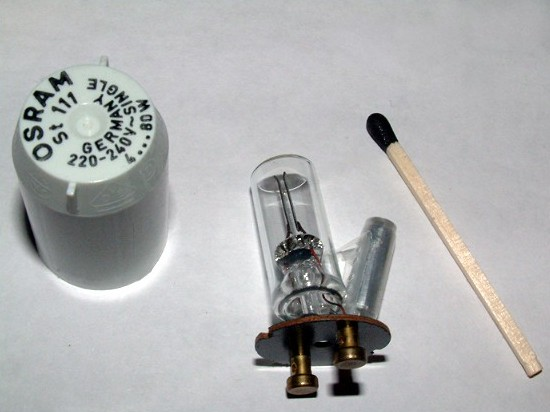
A preheat fluorescent lamp "starter" (automatic starting switch)

Before the 1960s, four-pin thermal starters and manual switches were used. A glow switch starter automatically preheats the lamp cathodes. It consists of a normally open bi-metallic switch in a small sealed gas-discharge lamp containing inert gas (neon or argon). The glow switch will cyclically warm the filaments and initiate a pulse voltage to strike the arc; the process repeats until the lamp is lit. Once the tube strikes, the impinging main discharge keeps the cathodes hot, permitting continued electron emission. The starter switch does not close again because the voltage across the lit tube is insufficient to start a glow discharge in the starter.

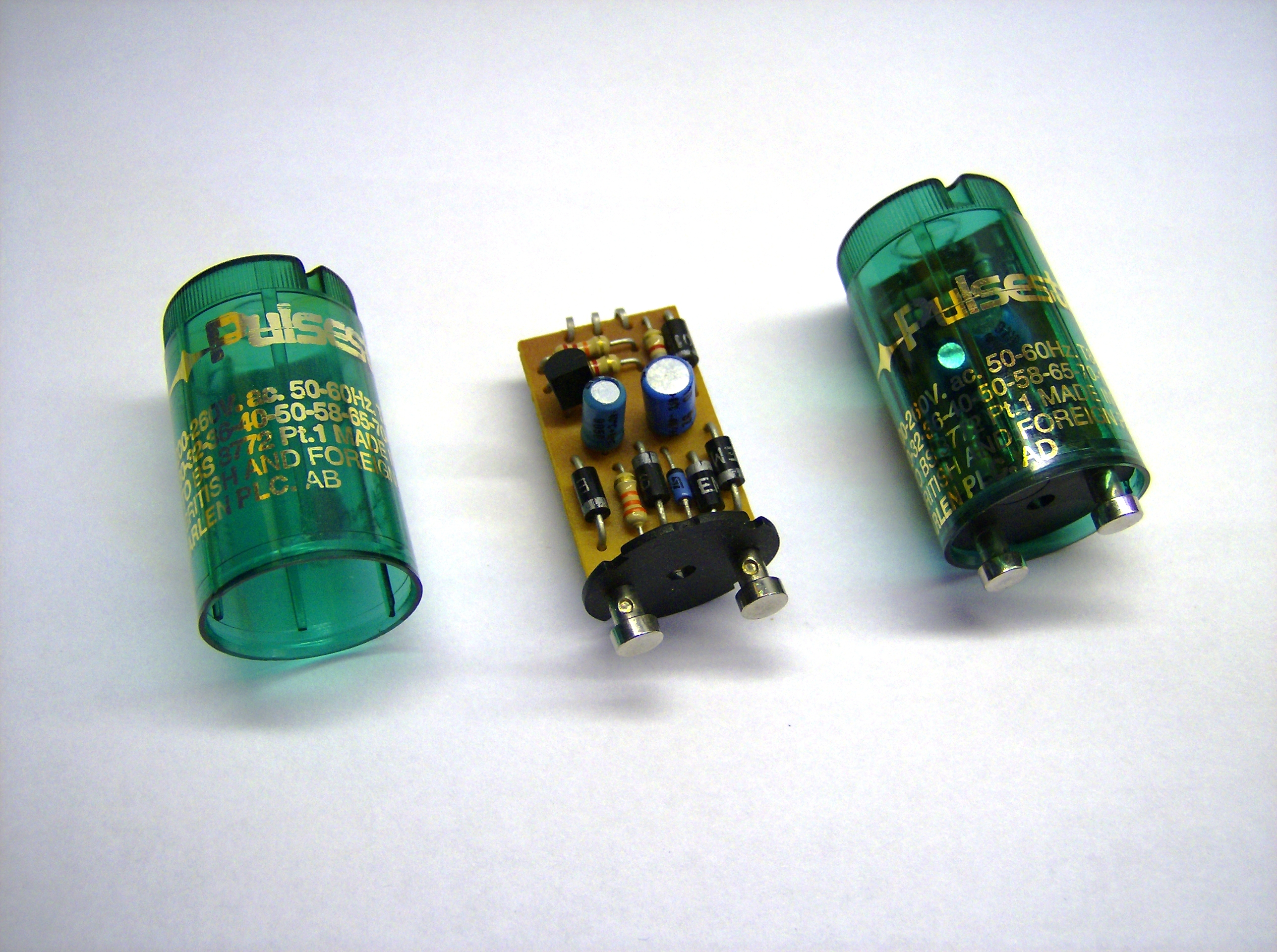
Electronic fluorescent lamp starters

With glow switch starters a failing tube will cycle repeatedly. Some starter systems used a thermal over-current trip to detect repeated starting attempts and disable the circuit until manually reset.

A power factor correction (PFC) capacitor draws leading current from the mains to compensate for the lagging current drawn by the lamp circuit.

Electronic starters use a different method to preheat the cathodes. They may be plug-in interchangeable with glow starters. They use a semiconductor switch and "soft start" the lamp by preheating the cathodes before applying a starting pulse which strikes the lamp first time without flickering; this dislodges a minimal amount of material from the cathodes during starting, giving longer lamp life. This is claimed to prolong lamp life by a factor of typically 3 to 4 times for a lamp frequently switched on as in domestic use, and to reduce the blackening of the ends of the lamp typical of fluorescent tubes. While the circuit is complex, the complexity is built into an integrated circuit chip. Electronic starters may be optimized for fast starting (typical start time of 0.3 seconds), or for most reliable starting even at low temperatures and with low supply voltages, with a startup time of 2–4 seconds. The faster-start units may produce audible noise during start-up.

Electronic starters only attempt to start a lamp for a short time when power is initially applied, and do not repeatedly attempt to restrike a lamp that is dead and unable to sustain an arc; some automatically stop trying to start a failed lamp. This eliminates the re-striking of a lamp and the continuous flashing of a failing lamp with a glow starter. Electronic starters are not subject to wear and do not need replacing periodically, although they may fail like any other electronic circuit. Manufacturers typically quote lives of 20 years, or as long as the light fitting.

==== Instant start ====
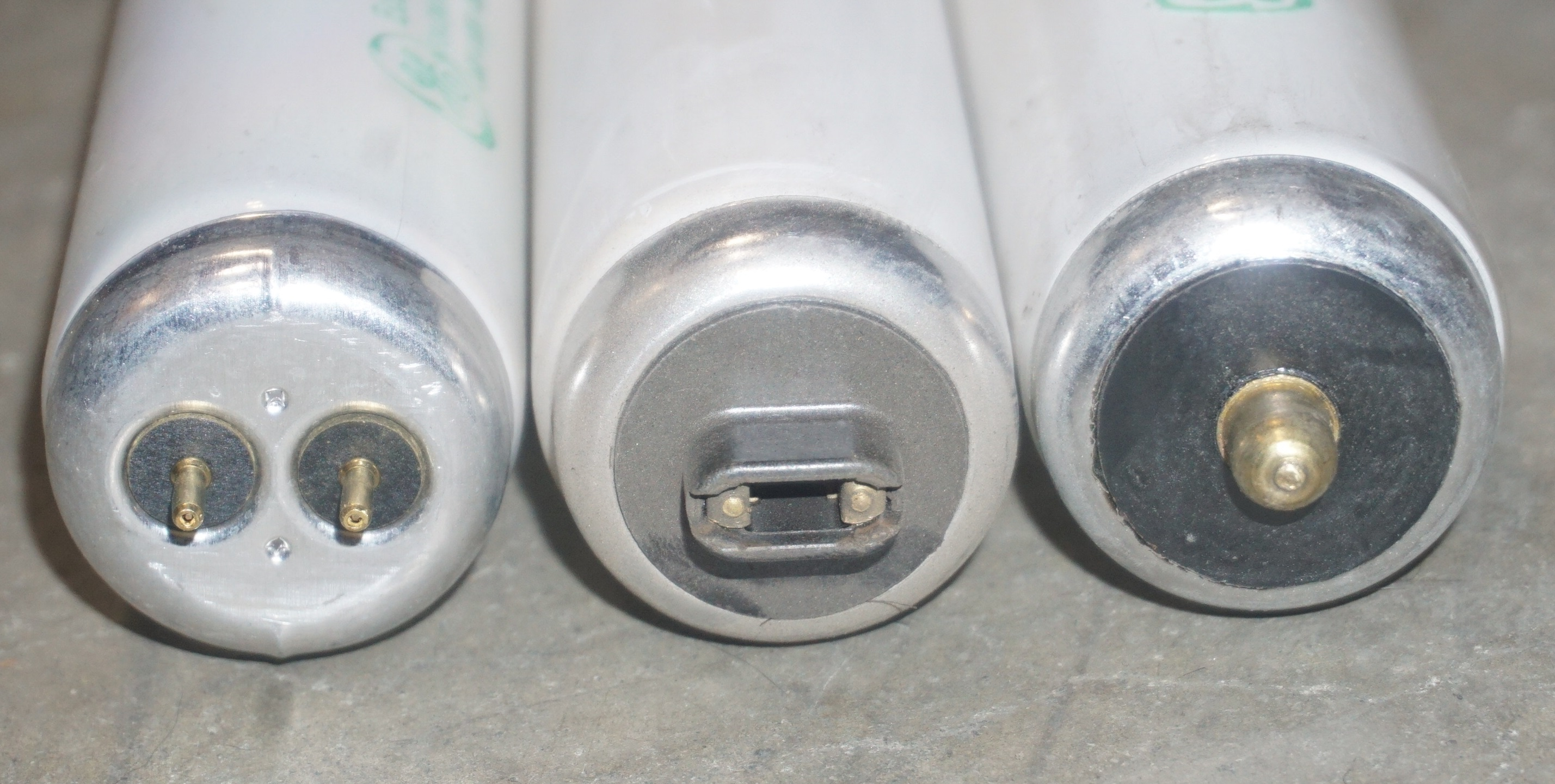
T12 fluorescent tubes. The first two are rapid start, (for "tombstone" and socket holders respectively) while the third is an instant-start lamp. The instant-start has a characteristic, rounded, single pin, for plugging into the spring-loaded socket holders.

Instant start fluorescent tubes were invented in 1944. Instant start simply uses a high enough voltage to break down the gas column and thereby start arc conduction. Once the high-voltage spark "strikes" the arc, the current is boosted until a glow discharge forms. As the lamp warms and pressure increases, the current continues to rise and both resistance and voltage falls, until mains or line-voltage takes over and the discharge becomes an arc. These tubes have no filaments and can be identified by a single pin at each end of the tube (for common lamps; compact cold-cathode lamps may also have a single pin, but operate from a transformer rather than a ballast). The lamp holders have a "disconnect" socket at the low-voltage end which disconnects the ballast when the tube is removed, to prevent electric shock. Instant-start lamps are slightly more energy efficient than rapid start, because they do not constantly send a heating current to the cathodes during operation, but the cold cathodes starting increases sputter, and they take much longer to transition from a glow discharge to an arc during warm up, thus the lifespan is typically about half of those seen in comparable rapid-start lamps.

==== Rapid start ====
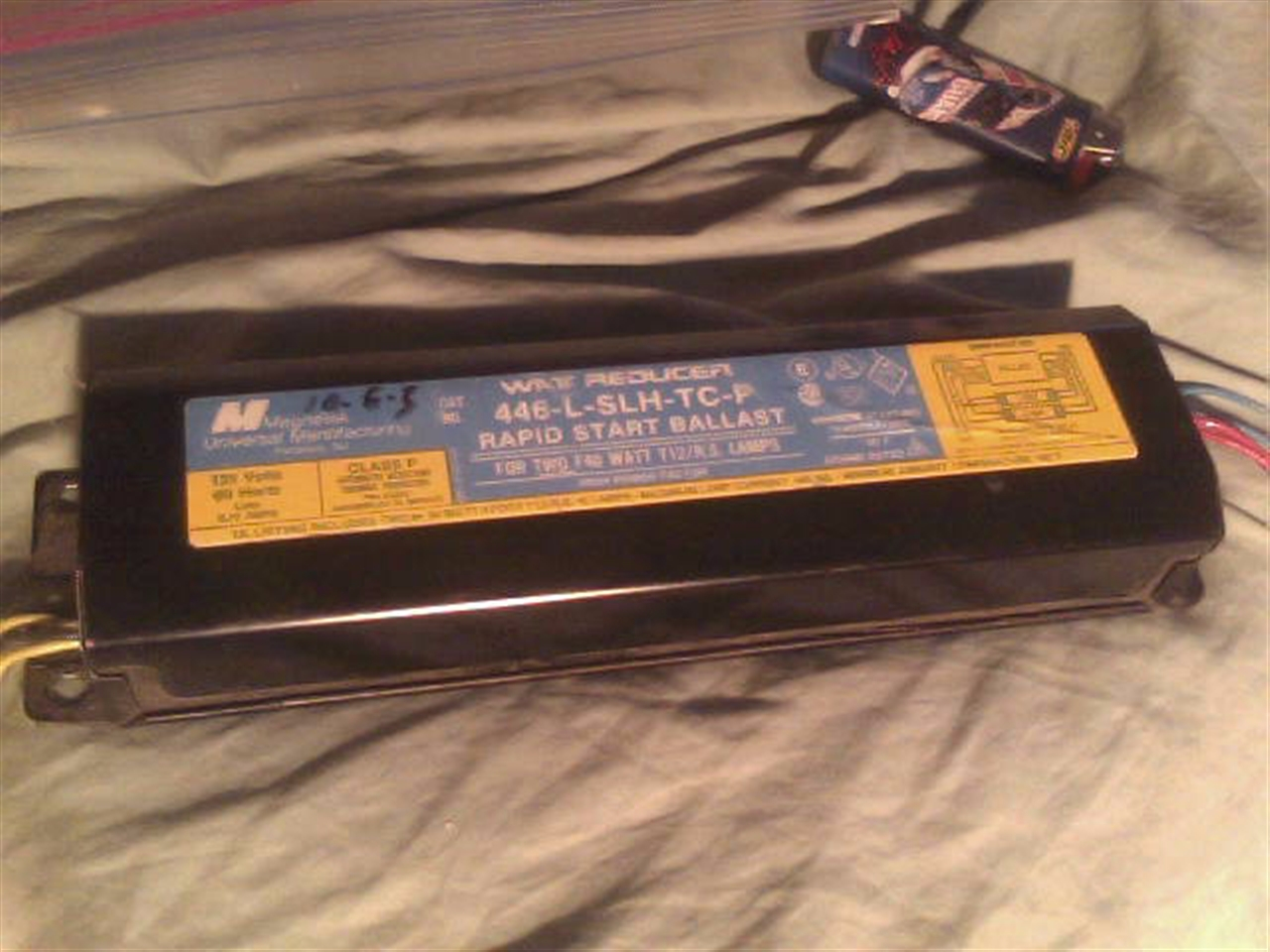
A rapid-start "iron" (magnetic) ballast continually heats the cathodes at the ends of the lamps. This ballast runs two F40T12 lamps in series.

Because the formation of an arc requires the thermionic emission of large quantities of electrons from the cathode, rapid start ballast designs provide windings within the ballast that continuously warm the cathode filaments. Usually operating at a lower arc voltage than the instant start design; no inductive voltage spike is produced for starting, so the lamps must be mounted near a grounded (earthed) reflector to allow the glow discharge to propagate through the tube and initiate the arc discharge via capacitive coupling. In some lamps a grounded "starting aid" strip is attached to the outside of the lamp glass. This ballast type is incompatible with the European energy saver T8 fluorescent lamps because these lamps require a higher starting voltage than that of the open circuit voltage of rapid start ballasts.

==== Quick-start ====
Quick-start ballasts use a small auto-transformer to heat the filaments when power is first applied. When an arc strikes, the filament heating power is reduced and the tube will start within half a second. The auto-transformer is either combined with the ballast or may be a separate unit. Tubes need to be mounted near an earthed metal reflector in order for them to strike. Quick-start ballasts are more common in commercial installations because of lower maintenance costs. A quick-start ballast eliminates the need for a starter switch, a common source of lamp failures. Nonetheless, Quick-start ballasts are also used in domestic (residential) installations because of the desirable feature that a Quick-start ballast light turns on nearly immediately after power is applied (when a switch is turned on). Quick-start ballasts are used only on 240 V circuits and are designed for use with the older, less efficient T12 tubes.

==== Semi-resonant start ====
A 65-watt fluorescent lamp starting on a semi-resonant start circuit

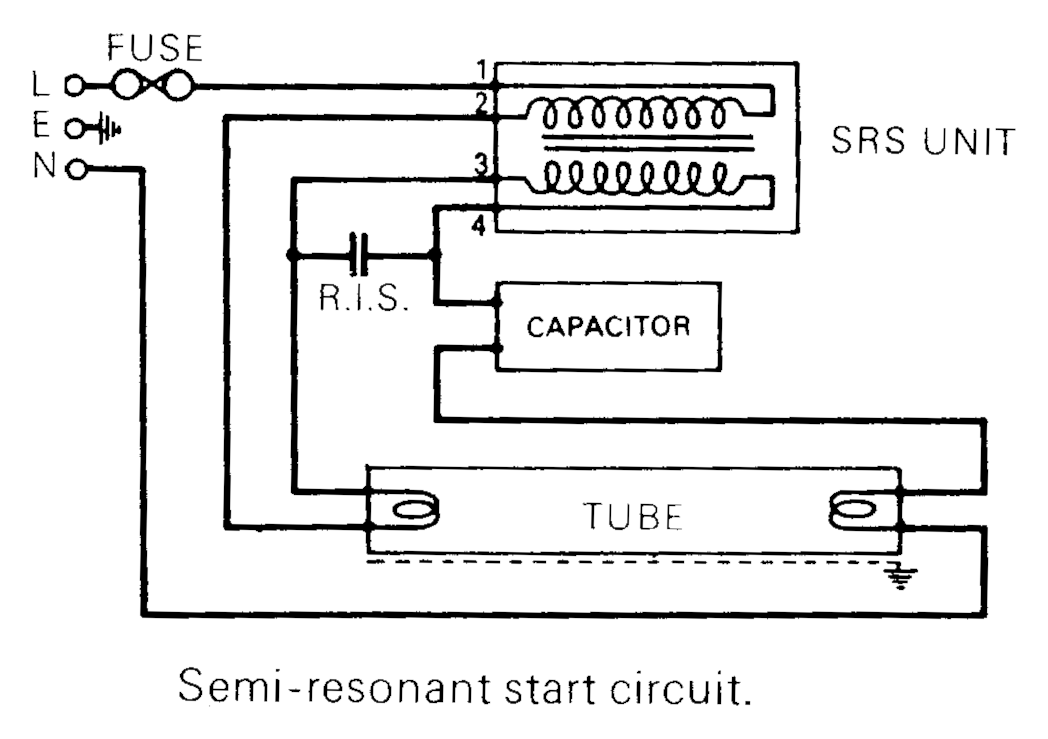
A semi-resonant start circuit diagram

The semi-resonant start circuit was invented by Thorn Lighting for use with T12 fluorescent tubes. This method uses a double wound transformer and a capacitor. With no arc current, the transformer and capacitor resonate at line frequency and generate about twice the supply voltage across the tube, and a small electrode heating current. This tube voltage is too low to strike the arc with cold electrodes, but as the electrodes heat up to thermionic emission temperature, the tube striking voltage falls below that of the ringing voltage, and the arc strikes. As the electrodes heat, the lamp slowly, over three to five seconds, reaches full brightness. As the arc current increases and tube voltage drops, the circuit provides current limiting.

Semi-resonant start circuits are mainly restricted to use in commercial installations because of the higher initial cost of circuit components. However, there are no starter switches to be replaced and cathode damage is reduced during starting making lamps last longer, reducing maintenance costs. Because of the high open circuit tube voltage, this starting method is particularly good for starting tubes in cold locations. Additionally, the circuit power factor is almost 1.0, and no additional power factor correction is needed in the lighting installation. As the design requires that twice the supply voltage must be lower than the cold-cathode striking voltage (or the tubes would erroneously instant-start), this design cannot be used with 240 volt AC power unless the tubes are at least 1.2 m (3 ft 11 in) length. Semi-resonant start fixtures are generally incompatible with energy saving T8 retrofit tubes, because such tubes have a higher starting voltage than T12 lamps and may not start reliably, especially in low temperatures. Recent proposals in some countries to phase out T12 tubes will reduce the application of this starting method.

==== Electronic ballasts ====
Fluorescent lamp with an electronic ballast

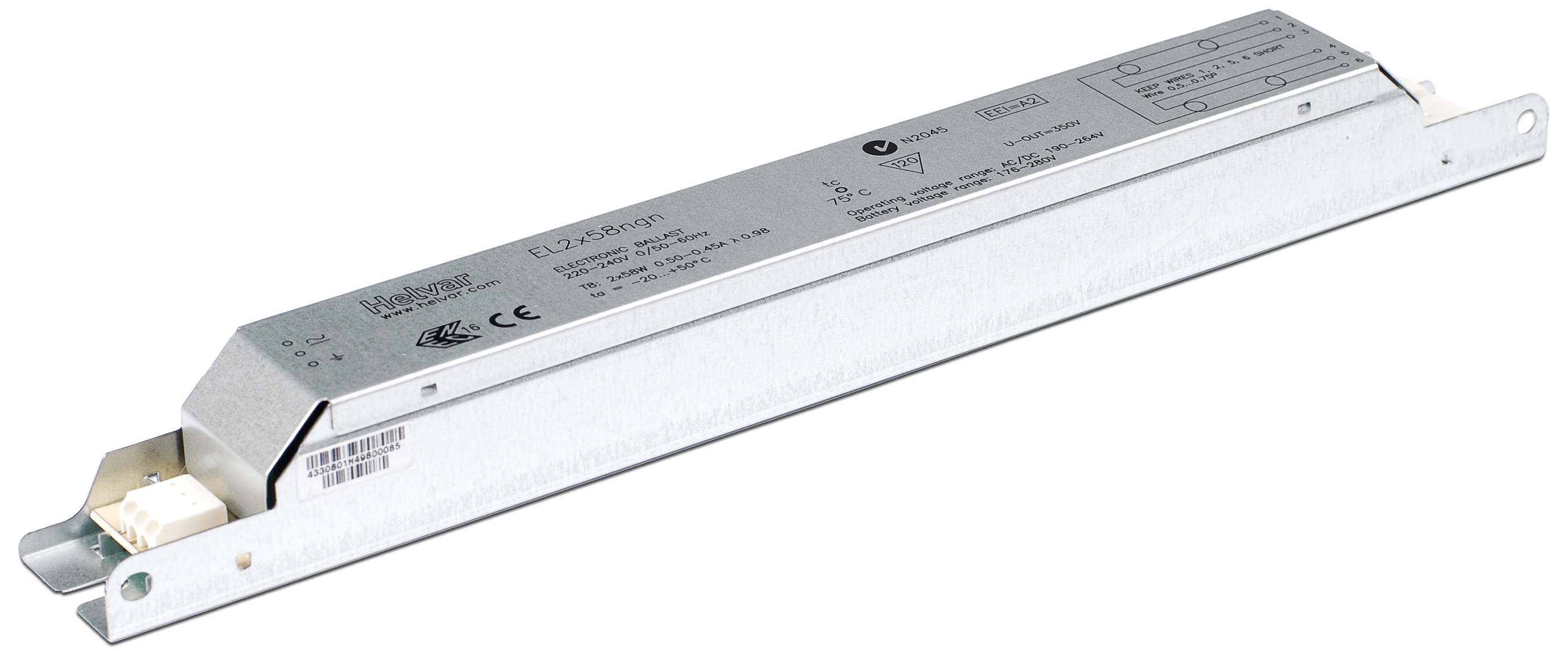
Electronic ballast for fluorescent lamp, 2×58 W

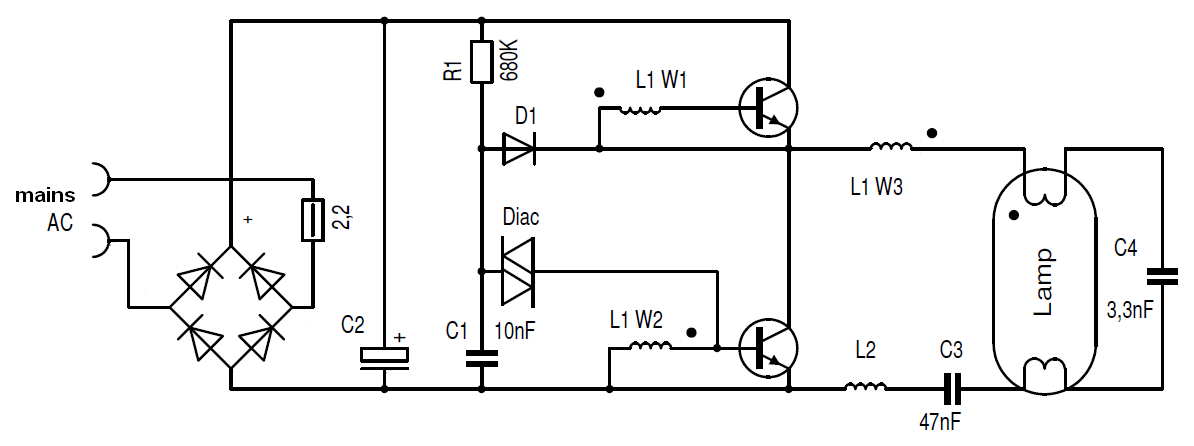
Electronic ballast basic schematic

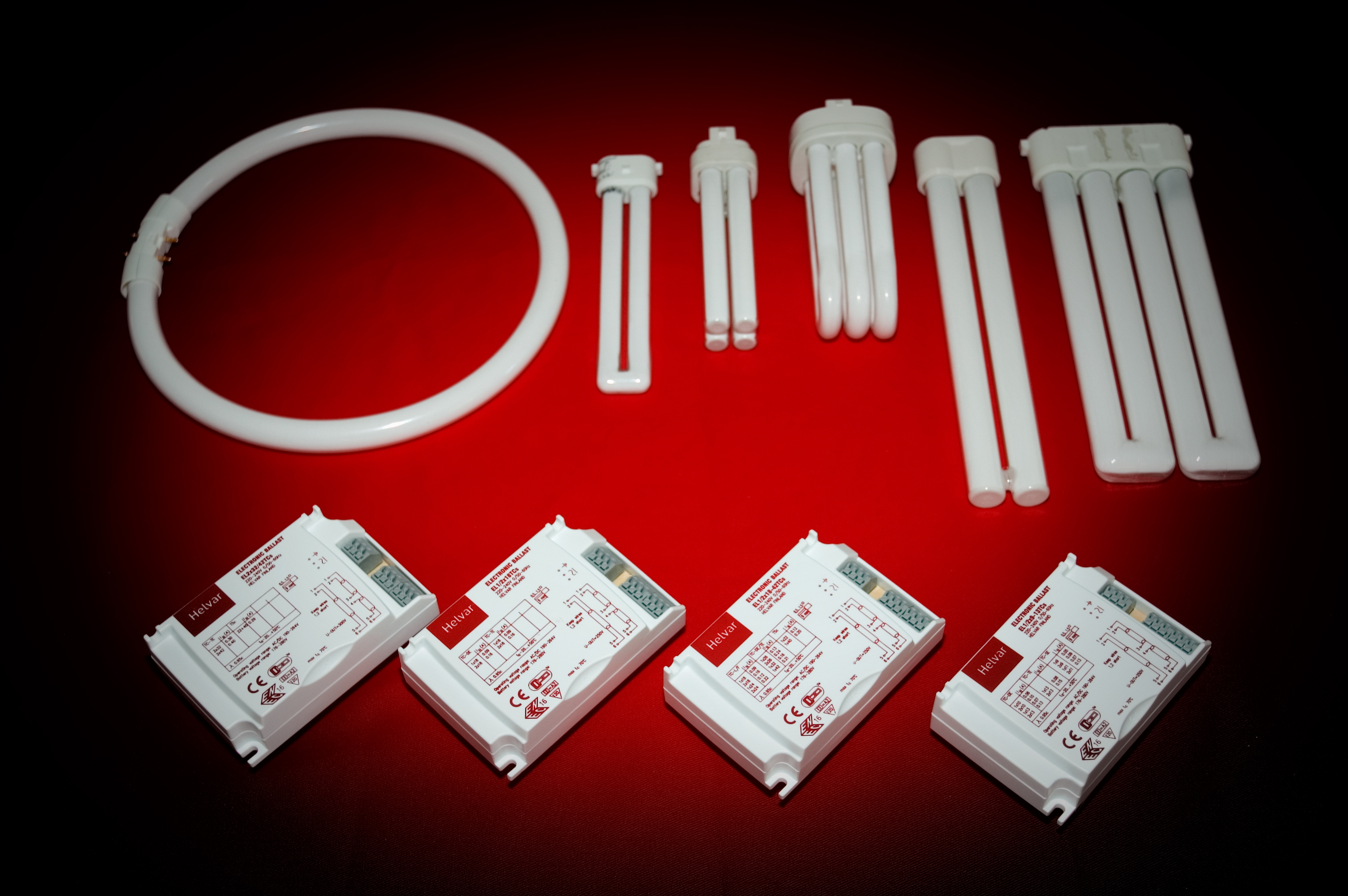
Electronic ballasts and different compact fluorescent lamps

Electronic ballasts employ transistors to change the supply frequency into high-frequency AC while regulating the current flow in the lamp. These ballasts take advantage of the higher efficacy of lamps, which rises by almost 10% at 10 kHz, compared to efficacy at normal power frequency. When the AC period is shorter than the relaxation time to de-ionize mercury atoms in the discharge column, the discharge stays closer to optimum operating condition. Electronic ballasts convert supply frequency AC power to variable frequency AC. The conversion can reduce lamp brightness modulation at twice the power supply frequency.

Low cost ballasts contain only a simple oscillator and series resonant LC circuit. This principle is called the current resonant inverter circuit. After a short time the voltage across the lamp reaches about 1 kV and the lamp instant-starts in cold cathode mode. The cathode filaments are still used for protection of the ballast from overheating if the lamp does not ignite. A few manufacturers use positive temperature coefficient (PTC) thermistors to disable instant starting and give some time to preheat the filaments.

More complex electronic ballasts use programmed start. The output frequency is started above the resonance frequency of the output circuit of the ballast; and after the filaments are heated, the frequency is rapidly decreased. If the frequency approaches the resonant frequency of the ballast, the output voltage will increase so much that the lamp will ignite. If the lamp does not ignite, an electronic circuit stops the operation of the ballast.

Many electronic ballasts are controlled by a microcontroller, and these are sometimes called digital ballasts. Digital ballasts can apply quite complex logic to lamp starting and operation. This enables functions such as testing for broken electrodes and missing tubes before attempting to start, detection of tube replacement, and detection of tube type, such that a single ballast can be used with several different tubes. Features such as dimming can be included in the embedded microcontroller software, and can be found in various manufacturers' products.

Since introduction in the 1990s, high-frequency ballasts have been used in general lighting fixtures with either rapid start or pre-heat lamps. These ballasts convert the incoming power to an output frequency in excess of 20 kHz. This increases lamp efficiency. These ballasts operate with voltages that can be almost 600 volts, requiring some consideration in housing design, and can cause a minor limitation in the length of the wire leads from the ballast to the lamp ends.

=== End of life ===
The life expectancy of a fluorescent lamp is primarily limited by the life of the cathode electrodes. To sustain an adequate current level, the electrodes are coated with an emission mixture of metal oxides. Every time the lamp is started, and during operation, a small amount of the cathode coating is sputtered off the electrodes by the impact of electrons and heavy ions within the tube. The sputtered material collects on the walls of the tube, darkening it. The starting method and frequency affect cathode sputtering. A filament may also break, disabling the lamp.

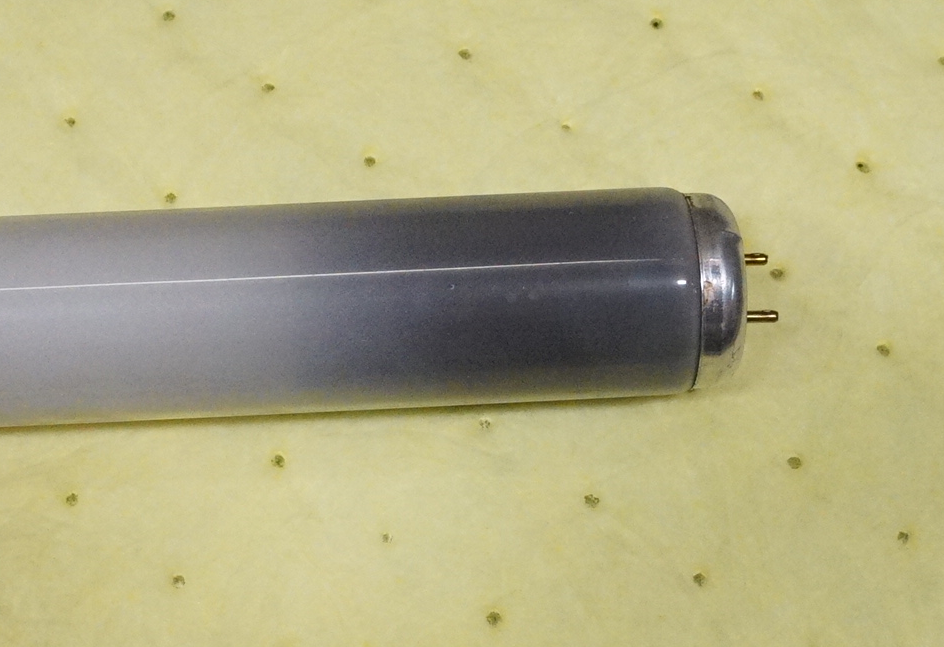
This tube failed after it had been turned on many times. Too much of the thermionic emission mix had sputtered off the cathodes, sticking to and blackening the glass.

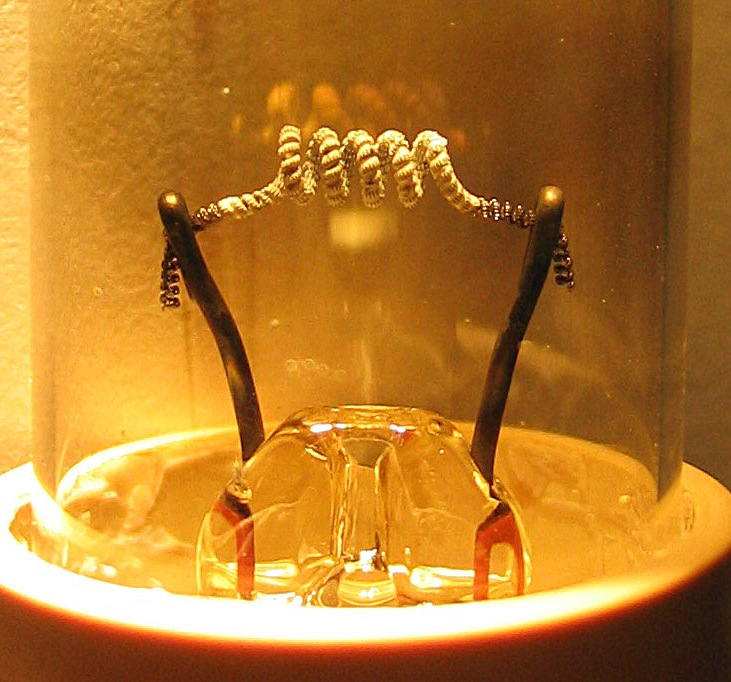
The filament of a low-pressure mercury gas-discharge lamp, with white thermionic emission coating acting as hot cathode. A little of the coating is sputtered away at every start; the lamp ultimately fails.

Low-mercury designs of lamps may fail when mercury is absorbed by the glass tube, phosphor, and internal components, and is no longer available to vaporize in the fill gas. Loss of mercury initially causes an extended warm-up time and a lower light output at full brightness, and finally causes the lamp to glow a dim pink when the argon gas takes over as the primary discharge.

Subjecting the tube to asymmetric current flow, effectively operates it under a DC bias, and causes asymmetric distribution of mercury ions along the tube. The localized depletion of mercury vapor pressure manifests itself as pink luminescence of the base gas in the vicinity of one of the electrodes, and the operating lifetime of the lamp may be dramatically shortened. This can be an issue with some poorly designed inverters.

The phosphors lining the lamp degrade with time as well, until a lamp no longer produces an acceptable fraction of its initial light output.

Failure of the integral electronic ballast of a compact fluorescent bulb will also end its usable life.

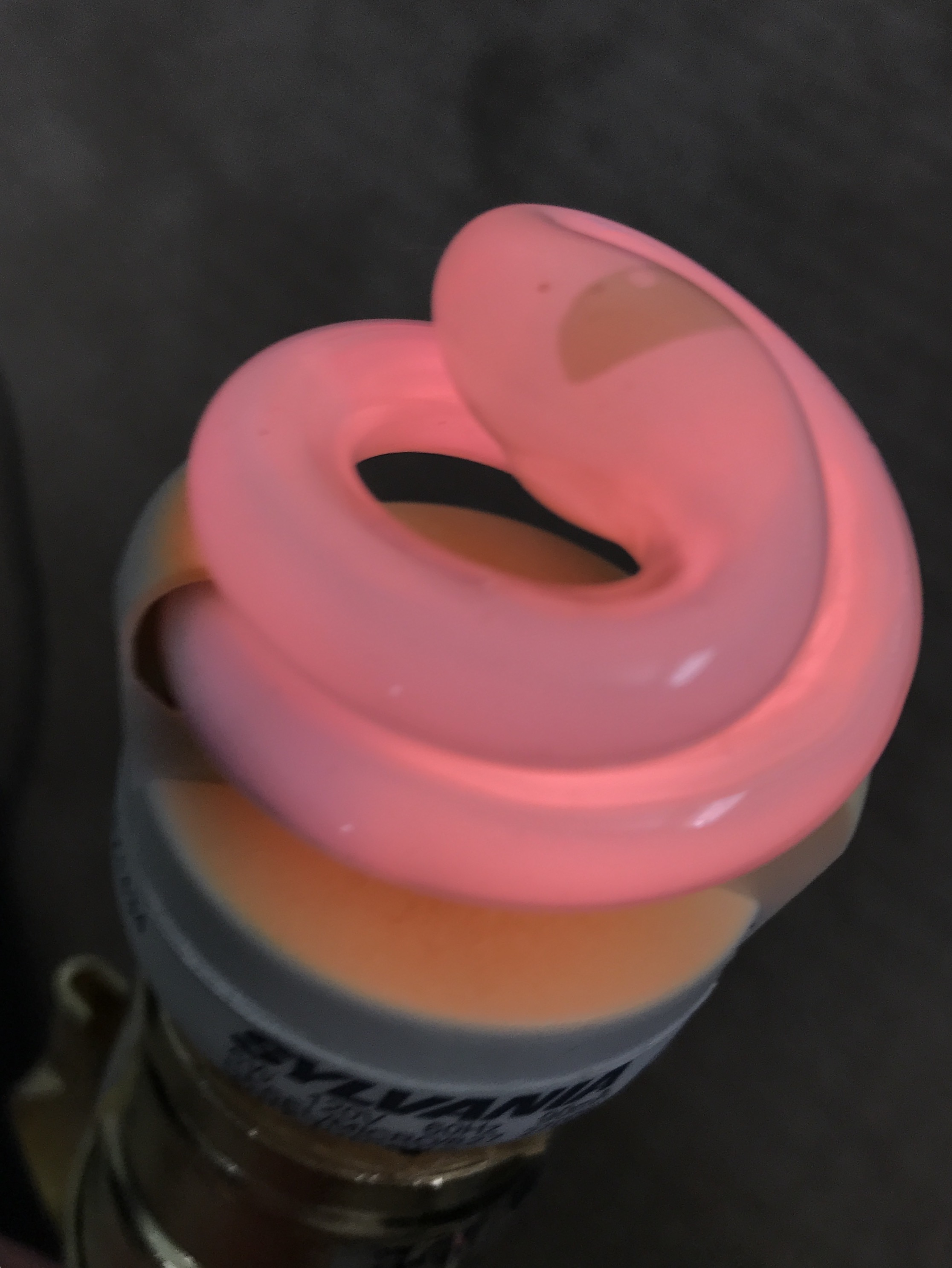
Compact fluorescent lamp that has reached end of life because of mercury adsorption. Light is produced only by the base argon fill.

== Phosphors and the spectrum of emitted light ==
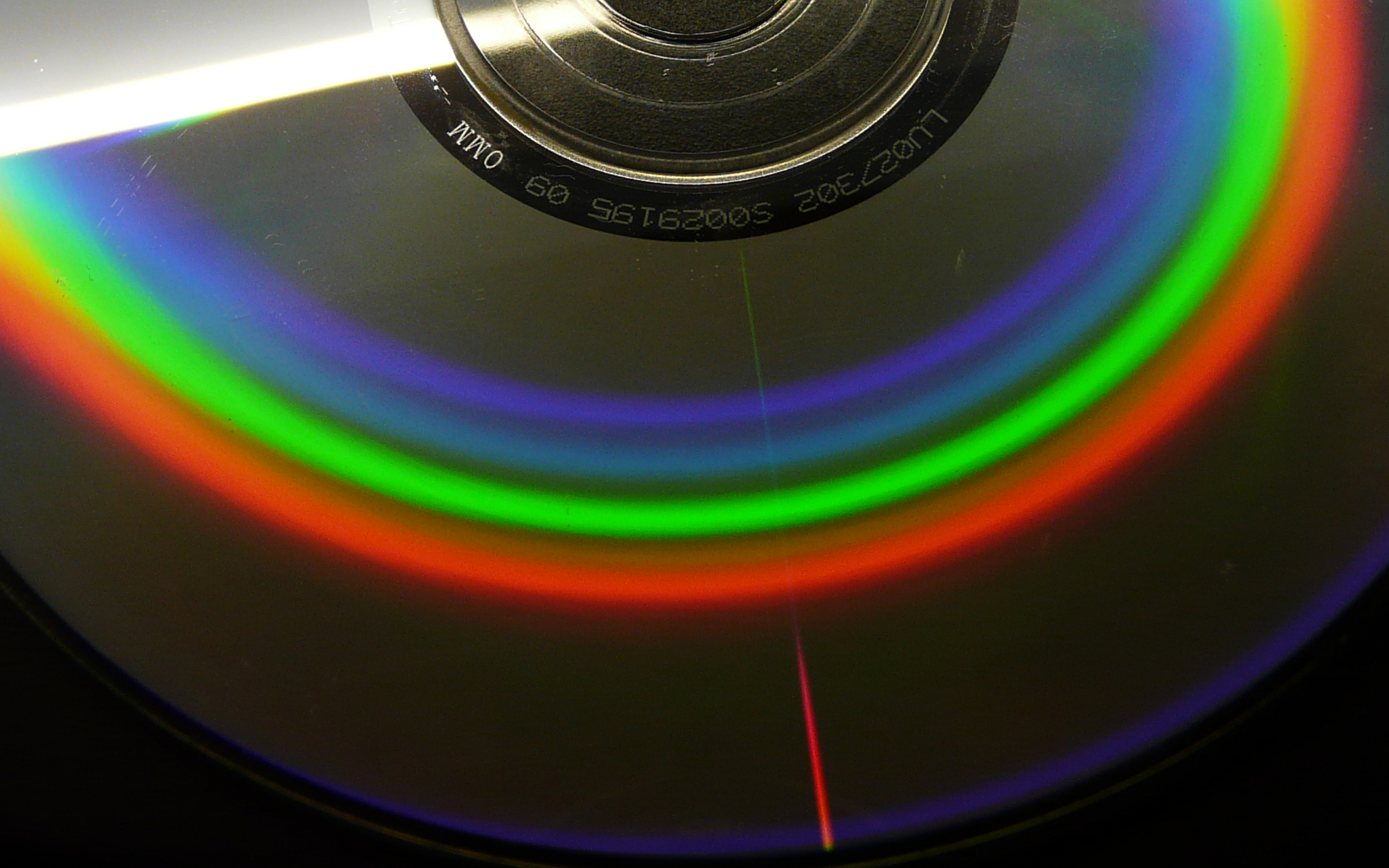
Light from a fluorescent tube lamp reflected by a CD shows the individual bands of color.

The spectrum of light emitted from a fluorescent lamp is the combination of light directly emitted by the mercury vapor, and light emitted by the phosphorescent coating. The spectral lines from the mercury emission and the phosphorescence effect give a combined spectral distribution of light that is different from those produced by incandescent sources. The relative intensity of light emitted in each narrow band of wavelengths over the visible spectrum is in different proportions compared to that of an incandescent source. Colored objects are perceived differently under light sources with differing spectral distributions. For example, some people find the color rendition produced by some fluorescent lamps to be harsh and displeasing. A healthy person can sometimes appear to have an unhealthy skin tone under fluorescent lighting. The extent to which this phenomenon occurs is related to the light's spectral composition, and may be gauged by its color rendering index (CRI).

=== Color temperature ===
The color temperature of different electric lamps

Correlated color temperature (CCT) is a measure of the "shade" of whiteness of a light source compared with a blackbody. Typical incandescent lighting is 2700 K, which is yellowish-white. Halogen lighting is 3000 K. Fluorescent lamps are manufactured to a chosen CCT by altering the mixture of phosphors inside the tube. Warm-white fluorescents have CCT of 2700 K and are popular for residential lighting. Neutral-white fluorescents have a CCT of 3000 K or 3500 K. Cool-white fluorescents have a CCT of 4100 K and are popular for office lighting. Daylight fluorescents have a CCT of 6500 K, which is bluish-white.

=== Color rendering index ===
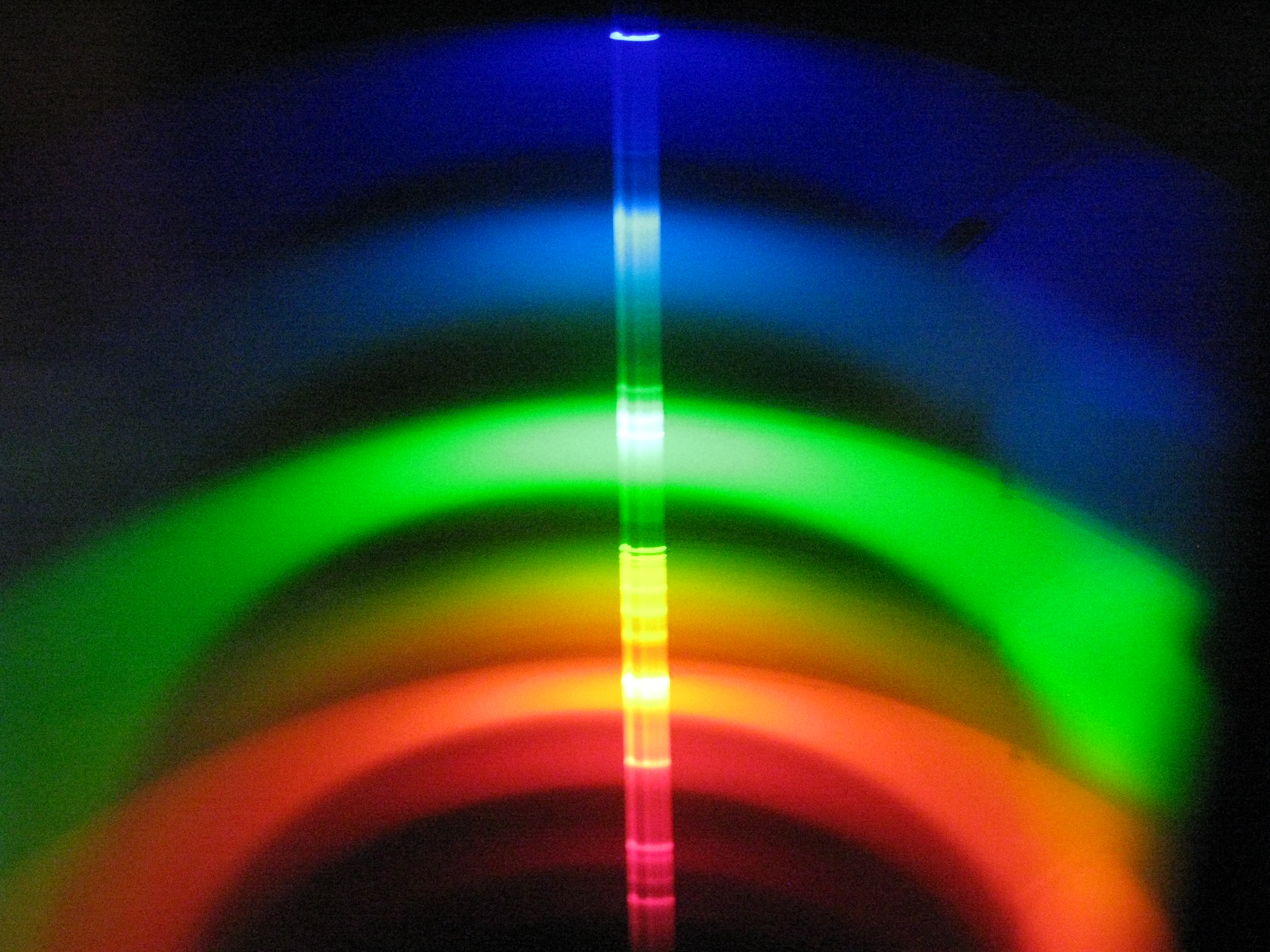
A helical cool-white fluorescent lamp reflected in a diffraction grating reveals the various spectral lines which make up the light.

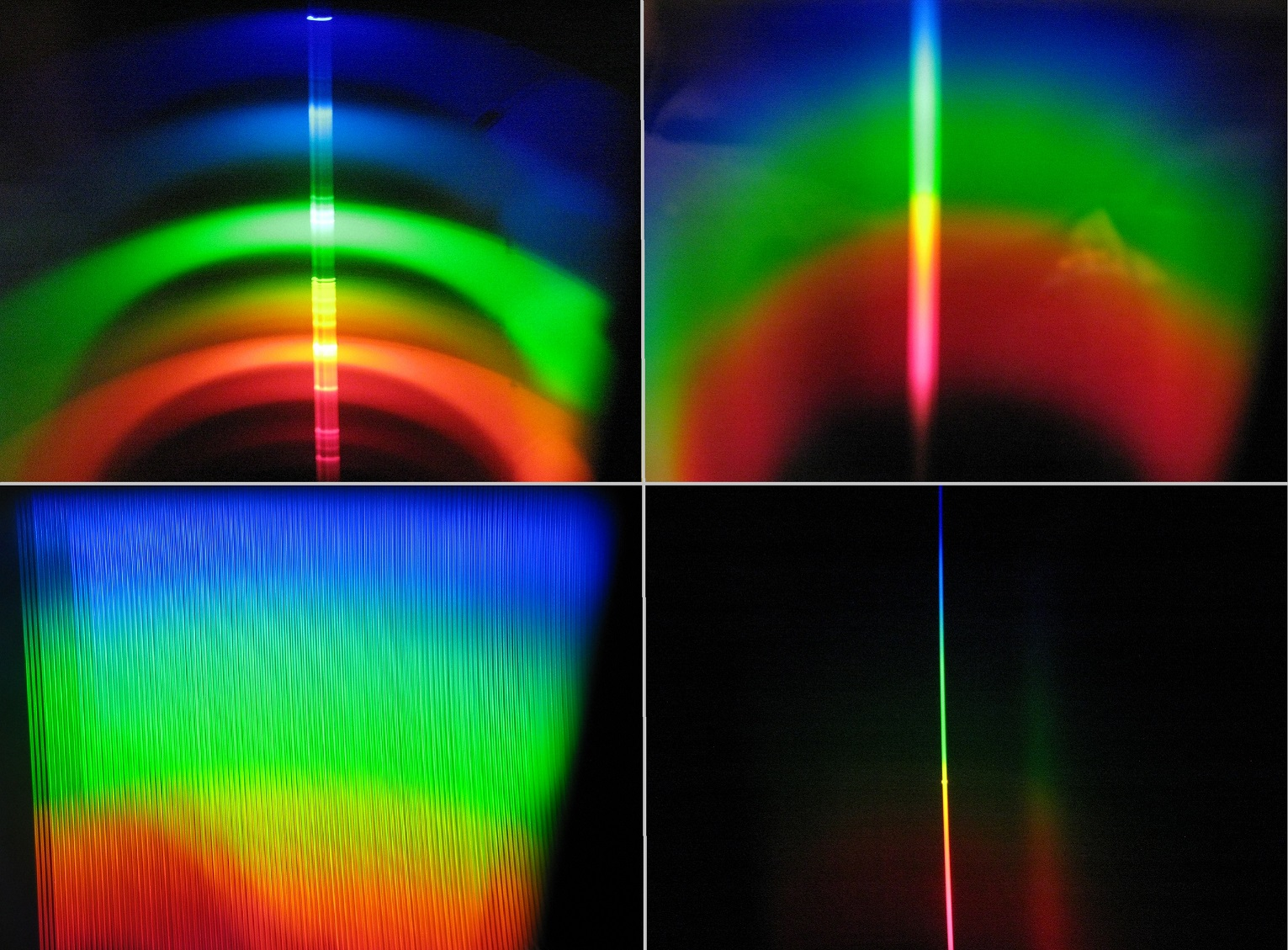
Fluorescent spectra in comparison with other forms of lighting. Clockwise from upper left: Fluorescent lamp, incandescent bulb, candle flame and LED lighting.

Color rendering index (CRI) is an attempt to measure the ability of a light source to reveal the colors of various objects faithfully in comparison to a black body radiator. Colors can be perceived using light from a source, relative to light from a reference source such as daylight or a blackbody of the same color temperature. By definition, an incandescent lamp has a CRI of 100. Real-life fluorescent tubes achieve CRIs of anywhere from 50 to 98. Fluorescent lamps with low CRI have phosphors that emit too little red light. Skin appears less pink, and hence "unhealthy" compared with incandescent lighting. Colored objects appear muted. For example, a low CRI 6800 K halophosphate tube (an extreme example) will make reds appear dull or even brown. Since the eye is relatively less efficient at detecting red light, an improvement in color rendering index, with increased energy in the red part of the spectrum, may reduce the overall luminous efficacy.

Lighting arrangements use fluorescent tubes in an assortment of tints of white. Mixing tube types within fittings can improve the color reproduction of lower quality tubes.

=== Phosphor composition ===
Some of the least pleasant light comes from tubes containing the older, calcium halophosphate phosphors (chemical formula Ca_{5}(P O_{4})_{3}(F, Cl):Sb^{3+}, Mn^{2+}). This phosphor mainly emits yellow and blue light, and relatively little green and red. In the absence of a reference, this mixture appears white to the eye, but the light has an incomplete spectrum. The color rendering index (CRI) of such lamps is around 60.

Since the 1990s, higher-quality fluorescent lamps use a rare-earth tri-phosphors mixture, based on europium and terbium ions, which have emission bands more evenly distributed over the spectrum of visible light, but with peaks in the red, green and blue. Triphosphor tubes give a more natural color reproduction to the human eye. The CRI of such lamps is typically 85.

Fluorescent-lamp spectra
| Typical fluorescent lamp with rare-earth phosphor | A typical "cool white" fluorescent lamp utilizing two rare-earth-doped phosphors, Tb^{3+}, Ce^{3+}:LaPO_{4} for green and blue emission and Eu:Y_{2}O_{3} for red. For an explanation of the origin of the individual peaks click on the image. Several of the spectral peaks are directly generated from the mercury arc. This is likely the most common type of fluorescent lamp in use today. |
| An older-style halophosphate-phosphor fluorescent lamp | Halophosphate phosphors in these lamps usually consist of trivalent antimony- and divalent manganese-doped calcium halophosphate (Ca_{5}(PO_{4})_{3}(Cl, F):Sb^{3+}, Mn^{2+}). The color of the light output can be adjusted by altering the ratio of the blue-emitting antimony dopant and orange-emitting manganese dopant. The color rendering ability of these older-style lamps is quite poor. Halophosphate phosphors were invented by A. H. McKeag et al. in 1942. |
| "Natural sunshine" fluorescent light | Peaks with stars are mercury lines. |
| Yellow fluorescent lights | The spectrum is nearly identical to a normal fluorescent lamp except for a near total lack of light shorter than 500 nanometers. This effect can be achieved through either specialized phosphor use or more commonly by the use of a simple yellow light filter. These lamps are commonly used as lighting for photolithography work in cleanrooms and as "bug repellent" outdoor lighting (the efficacy of which is questionable). |
| Spectrum of a "blacklight" lamp | There is typically only one phosphor present in a blacklight lamp, usually consisting of europium-doped strontium fluoroborate, which is contained in an envelope of Wood's glass. |

== Applications ==
Fluorescent lamps come in many shapes and sizes. Many compact fluorescent lamps integrate the auxiliary electronics into the base of the lamp, allowing them to fit into a regular light bulb socket.

In US residences, fluorescent lamps are mostly found in kitchens, basements, or garages. Schools and businesses find the cost savings of fluorescent lamps to be significant and rarely use incandescent lights. Electricity costs, tax incentives and building codes result in greater use in locales such as California. Fluorescent use is declining, supplanted by LED lighting, which is more energy efficient and does not contain mercury.

In other countries, residential use of fluorescent lighting varies depending on the price of energy, financial and environmental concerns of the local population, and acceptability of the light output. In East and Southeast Asia incandescent bulbs are rare in buildings.

Many countries are banning incandescent light bulbs to encourage substitution with other types of energy-efficient lamps.

In addition to general lighting, special fluorescent lights are often used in stage lighting for film and video production. They are cooler than traditional halogen light sources, and use high-frequency ballasts to prevent video flickering and high color-rendition index lamps to approximate daylight color temperatures.

== Comparison to incandescent lamps ==
=== Luminous efficacy ===
Fluorescent lamps convert more of the input power to visible light than incandescent lamps. A typical 100 watt tungsten filament incandescent lamp may convert only 5% of its power input to visible white light (400–700 nm wavelength), whereas typical fluorescent lamps convert about 22% of the power input to visible white light.

The efficacy of fluorescent tubes ranges from about 16 lumens per watt for a 4 watt tube with an ordinary ballast to over 100 lumens per watt with a modern electronic ballast, commonly averaging 50 to 67 lm/W overall. Ballast loss can be about 25% of the lamp power with magnetic ballasts, and around 10% with electronic ballasts.

Fluorescent lamp efficacy is dependent on lamp temperature at the coldest part of the lamp. In T8 lamps this is in the center of the tube. In T5 lamps this is at the end of the tube with the text stamped on it. The ideal temperature for a T8 lamp is 25 °C (77 °F) while the T5 lamp is ideally at 35 °C (95 °F).

=== Life ===
Typically a fluorescent lamp will last 10 to 20 times as long as an equivalent incandescent lamp when operated several hours at a time. Under standard test conditions fluorescent lamps last 6,000 to 90,000 hours (2 to 31 years at 8 hours per day).

The higher initial cost of a fluorescent lamp compared with an incandescent lamp is usually compensated for by lower energy consumption over its life.

=== Lower luminance ===
Compared with an incandescent lamp, a fluorescent tube is a more diffuse and physically larger light source. In suitably designed lamps, light can be more evenly distributed without point source of glare such as seen from an undiffused incandescent filament; the lamp is large compared to the typical distance between lamp and illuminated surfaces.

=== Lower heat ===
Fluorescent lamps give off about one-fifth the heat of equivalent incandescent lamps. This greatly reduces the size, cost and energy consumption by air conditioning for office buildings that typically have many lights and few windows.

== Disadvantages ==
=== Frequent switching ===
Frequent switching (more than every 3 hours) will shorten the life of lamps. Each start cycle slightly erodes the electron-emitting surface of the cathodes; when all the emission material is gone, the lamp cannot start with the available ballast voltage. Fixtures for flashing lights (such as for advertising) use a ballast that maintains cathode temperature when the arc is off, preserving the life of the lamp.

The extra energy used to start a fluorescent lamp is equivalent to a few seconds of normal operation; it is more energy-efficient to switch off lamps when not required for several minutes.

=== Mercury content ===
If a fluorescent lamp is broken, a very small amount of mercury can contaminate the surrounding environment. About 99% of the mercury is typically contained in the phosphor, especially on lamps that are near the end of their life. Broken lamps may release mercury if not cleaned with correct methods.

Due to the mercury content, discarded fluorescent lamps must be treated as hazardous waste in some jurisdictions. For large users of fluorescent lamps, recycling services are available in some areas, and may be required by regulation. In some areas, recycling is also available to consumers.

=== Ultraviolet emission ===
Fluorescent lamps emit a small amount of ultraviolet (UV) light. A 1993 study in the US found that ultraviolet exposure from sitting under fluorescent lights for eight hours is equivalent to one minute of sun exposure. Ultraviolet radiation from compact fluorescent lamps may exacerbate symptoms in photosensitive individuals.

Museum artifacts may need protection from UV light to prevent degradation of pigments or textiles.

=== Ballast ===
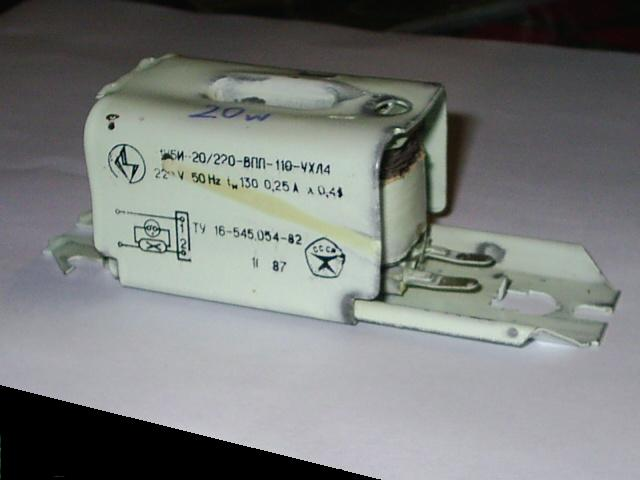
Magnetic ballasts have a low power factor, when not connected to a power factor correction capacitor. This increases current drawn by the lighting fixture.

Fluorescent lamps require a ballast to stabilize the current through the lamp, and to provide the initial striking voltage required to start the arc discharge. Often one ballast is shared between two or more lamps. Electromagnetic ballasts can produce an audible humming or buzzing noise. In North America, magnetic ballasts are usually filled with a tar-like potting compound to reduce emitted noise. Hum is eliminated in lamps with a high-frequency electronic ballast. Energy lost in magnetic ballasts is around 10% of lamp input power according to GE literature from 1978. Electronic ballasts reduce this loss.

=== Power quality and radio interference ===
Simple inductive fluorescent lamp ballasts have a power factor of less than unity. Inductive ballasts can be connected to, or may include, power factor correction capacitors. Simple electronic ballasts may also have low power factor due to their rectifier input stage.

Fluorescent lamps are a non-linear load and generate harmonic currents in the electrical power supply. The arc within the lamp may generate radio frequency noise, which can be conducted through power wiring. Suppression of radio interference is possible. Very good suppression is possible, but adds to the cost of the fluorescent fixtures.

Fluorescent lamps near end of life can present a serious radio frequency interference hazard. Oscillations are generated from the negative differential resistance of the arc, and the current flow through the tube can form a tuned circuit whose frequency depends on path length.

=== Operating temperature ===
Fluorescent lamps operate best around room temperature. At lower or higher temperatures, efficacy decreases. At below-freezing temperatures standard lamps may not start. Special lamps may be used for reliable service outdoors in cold weather.

=== Lamp shape ===
Fluorescent tubes are long, low-luminance sources compared with high intensity discharge lamps, incandescent and halogen lamps and high power LEDs. However, low luminous intensity of the emitting surface is useful because it reduces glare. Lamp fixture design must control light from a long tube instead of a compact globe. The compact fluorescent lamp (CFL) replaces regular incandescent bulbs in many light fixtures where space permits.

=== Flicker ===
Fluorescent lamps with magnetic ballasts flicker at a normally unnoticeable frequency of 100 or 120 Hz and this flickering can cause problems for some individuals with light sensitivity; they are listed as problematic for some individuals with autism, epilepsy, lupus, chronic fatigue syndrome, Lyme disease, and vertigo.

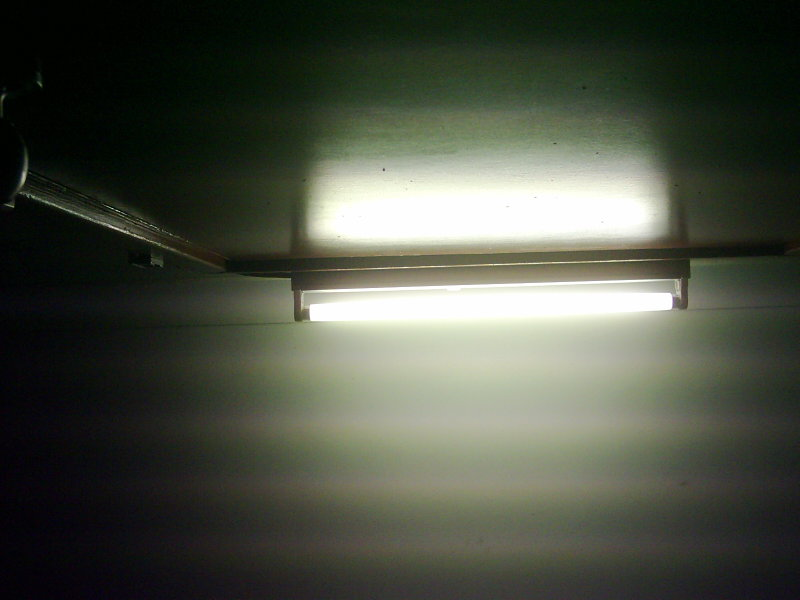
The "beat effect" problem created when shooting photos under standard fluorescent lighting

A stroboscopic effect can be noticed, where something spinning at just the right speed may appear stationary if illuminated solely by a single fluorescent lamp. This effect is eliminated by paired lamps operating on a lead-lag ballast. Unlike a true strobe lamp, the light level drops in appreciable time and so substantial "blurring" of the moving part would be evident.

Fluorescent lamps may produce flicker at the power supply frequency (50 or 60 Hz), which is noticeable by more people. This happens if a damaged or failed cathode results in slight rectification and uneven light output in positive and negative going AC cycles. Power frequency flicker can be emitted from the ends of the tubes, if each tube electrode produces a slightly different light output pattern on each half-cycle. Flicker at power frequency is more noticeable in the peripheral vision than it is when viewed directly.

Near the end of life, fluorescent lamps can start flickering at a frequency lower than the power frequency. This is due to instability in the negative resistance of arc discharge, which can be from a bad lamp or ballast or poor connection.

New fluorescent lamps may show a twisting spiral pattern of light in a part of the lamp. This effect is due to loose cathode material and usually disappears after a few hours of operation.

The "beat effect" problem created when shooting films under standard fluorescent lighting

Electromagnetic ballasts may also cause problems for video recording as there can be a so-called beat effect between the video frame rate and the fluctuations in intensity of the fluorescent lamp.

Fluorescent lamps with electronic ballasts do not flicker, since above about 5 kHz, the excited electron state half-life is longer than a half cycle, and light production becomes continuous. Operating frequencies of electronic ballasts are selected to avoid interference with infrared remote controls. Poor quality or faulty electronic ballasts may have considerable 100/120 Hz modulation of the light.

=== Dimming ===
Fluorescent light fixtures cannot be connected to dimmer switches intended for incandescent lamps. Two effects are responsible for this: the waveform of the voltage emitted by a standard phase-control dimmer interacts badly with many ballasts, and it becomes difficult to sustain an arc in the fluorescent tube at low power levels. Dimming installations require a compatible dimming ballast. Some models of compact fluorescent lamps can be dimmed; in the United States, such lamps are identified as complying with UL standard 1993.

== Lamp sizes and designations ==
Systematic nomenclature identifies mass-market lamps as to general shape, power rating, length, color, and other electrical and illuminating characteristics.

In the United States and Canada, lamps are typically identified by a code such as FxxTy, where F is for fluorescent, the first number (xx) indicates either the power in watts or length in inches, the T indicates that the shape of the bulb is tubular, and the last number (y) is the diameter in eighths of an inch (sometimes in millimeters, rounded-up to the nearest millimeter). Typical diameters are T12 or T38 (1 1/2 inches or 38 mm) for residential lamps, T8 or T26 (1 inch or 25 mm) for commercial energy-saving lamps.

== Overdriving ==
Overdriving a fluorescent lamp is a method of getting more light from each tube than is obtained under rated conditions. ODNO (Overdriven Normal Output) fluorescent tubes are generally used when there is not enough room to put in more bulbs to increase the light. The method is effective, but generates some additional issues. This technique has become popular among aquatic gardeners as a cost-effective way to add more light to their aquariums. Overdriving is done by rewiring lamp fixtures to increase lamp current; however, lamp life is reduced.

== Other fluorescent lamps ==
=== Black light ===
Blacklights are a subset of fluorescent lamps that are used to provide UVA light (at about 360 nm wavelength). They are built in the same fashion as conventional fluorescent lamps but the glass tube is coated with a phosphor that converts the short-wave UV within the tube to long-wave UV rather than to visible light. They are used to provoke fluorescence (to provide dramatic effects using blacklight paint and to detect materials such as urine and certain dyes that would be invisible in visible light) as well as to attract insects to bug zappers.

So-called blacklite blue lamps are also made from more expensive deep purple glass known as Wood's glass rather than clear glass. The deep purple glass filters out most of the visible colors of light directly emitted by the mercury-vapor discharge, producing proportionally less visible light compared with UV light. This allows UV-induced fluorescence to be seen more easily (thereby allowing blacklight posters to seem much more dramatic). The blacklight lamps used in bug zappers do not require this refinement so it is usually omitted in the interest of cost; they are called simply blacklite (and not blacklite blue).

=== Tanning lamp ===
The lamps used in tanning beds contain a different phosphor blend (typically 3 to 5 or more phosphors) that emits both UVA and UVB, provoking a tanning response in most human skin. Typically, the output is rated as 3–10% UVB (5% most typical) with the remaining UV as UVA. These are mainly high output 100W lamps, although 160W very high output are somewhat common. One common phosphor used in these lamps is lead-activated barium disilicate, but a europium-activated strontium fluoroborate is also used. Early lamps used thallium as an activator, but emissions of thallium during manufacture were toxic.

=== UVB medical lamps ===
The lamps used in phototherapy contain a phosphor that emits only UVB ultraviolet light. There are two types: broadband UVB that gives 290–320 nanometer with peak wavelength of 306 nm, and narrowband UVB that gives 311–313 nanometer. Because of the longer wavelength, the narrowband UVB bulbs do not cause erythema in the skin like the broadband. They requires a 10–20 times higher dose to the skin and they require more bulbs and longer exposure time. The narrowband is good for psoriasis, eczema (atopic dermatitis), vitiligo, lichen planus, and some other skin diseases. The broadband is better for increasing Vitamin D3 in the body.

=== Grow lamp ===
Grow lamps contain phosphor blends that encourage photosynthesis, growth, or flowering in plants, algae, photosynthetic bacteria, and other light-dependent organisms. These often emit light primarily in the red and blue color range, which is absorbed by chlorophyll and used for photosynthesis in plants.

=== Infrared lamps ===
Lamps can be made with a lithium metaluminate phosphor activated with iron. This phosphor has peak emissions between 675 and 875 nanometers, with lesser emissions in the deep red part of the visible spectrum.

=== Bilirubin lamps ===
Deep blue light generated from a europium-activated phosphor is used in the light therapy treatment of jaundice; light of this color penetrates skin and helps in the breakup of excess bilirubin.

=== Germicidal lamp ===
Germicidal lamps contain no phosphor at all, making them mercury vapor gas discharge lamps rather than fluorescent. Their tubes are made of fused quartz transparent to the UVC light emitted by the mercury discharge. The 254 nm UVC emitted by these tubes will kill germs and the 184.45 nm far UV will ionize oxygen to ozone. Lamps labeled OF block the 184.45 nm far UV and do not produce significant ozone. In addition the UVC can cause eye and skin damage. They are sometimes used by geologists to identify certain species of minerals by the color of their fluorescence when fitted with filters that pass the short-wave UV and block visible light produced by the mercury discharge. They are also used in some EPROM erasers. Germicidal lamps have designations beginning with G, for example G30T8 for a 30-watt, 1-inch (2.5 cm) diameter, 36-inch (91 cm) long germicidal lamp (as opposed to an F30T8, which would be the fluorescent lamp of the same size and rating).

=== Electrodeless lamp ===
Electrodeless induction lamps are fluorescent lamps without internal electrodes. They have been commercially available since 1990. A current is induced into the gas column using electromagnetic induction. Because the electrodes are usually the life-limiting element of fluorescent lamps, such electrodeless lamps can have a very long service life, although they also have a higher purchase price.

=== Cold-cathode fluorescent lamp ===
Cold-cathode fluorescent lamps were used as backlighting for LCDs in computer monitors and televisions before the use of LED-backlit LCDs. They were also popular with computer case modders.

== Science demonstrations ==
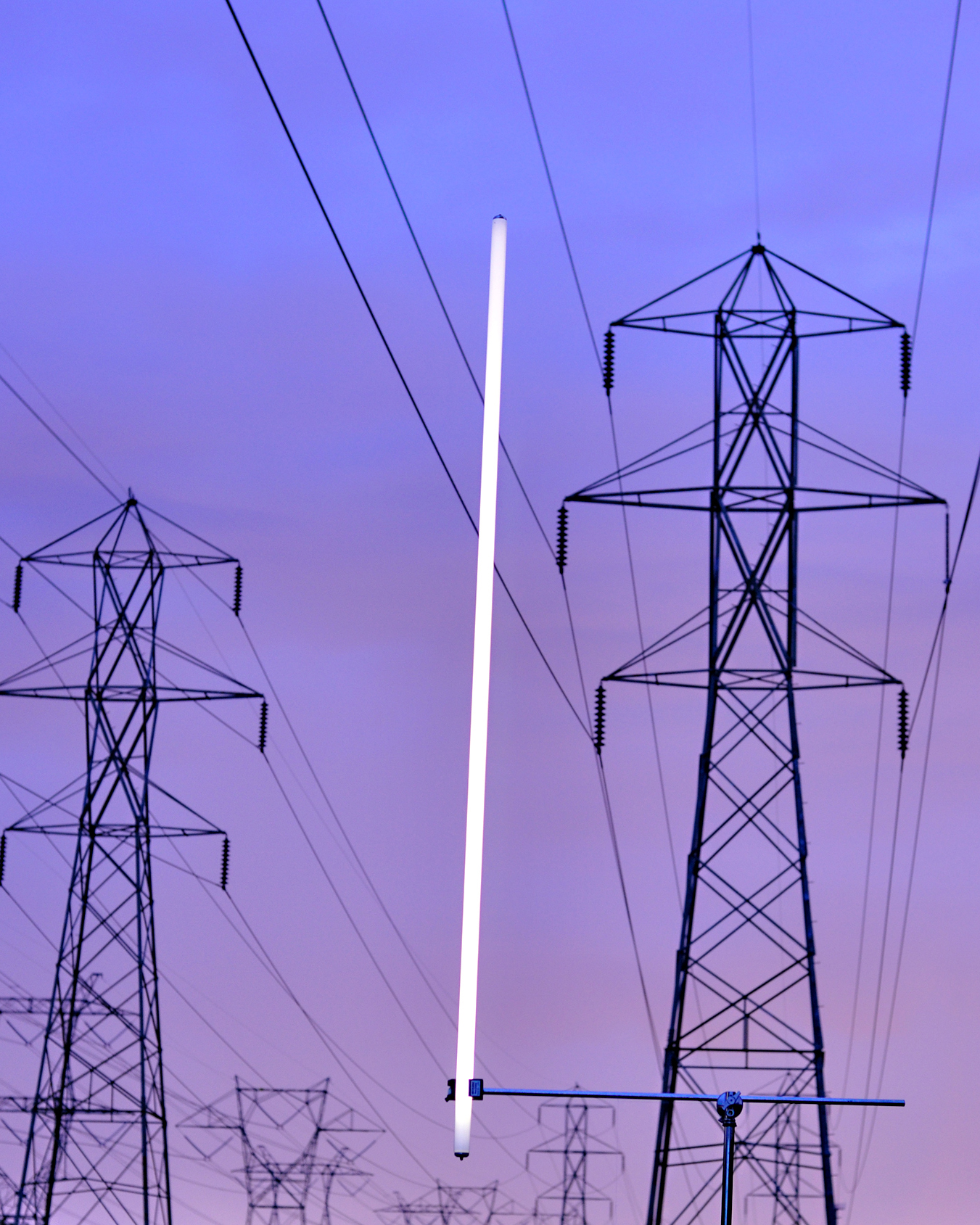
Capacitive coupling with high-voltage power lines can light a lamp continuously at low intensity.

Fluorescent lamps can be illuminated by means other than a proper electrical connection. These other methods, however, result in very dim or very short-lived illumination, and so are seen mostly in science demonstrations. Static electricity or a Van de Graaff generator will cause a lamp to flash momentarily as it discharges a high-voltage capacitance. A Tesla coil will pass high-frequency current through the tube, and since it has a high voltage as well, the gases within the tube will ionize and emit light. This also works with plasma globes. Capacitive coupling with high-voltage power lines can light a lamp continuously at low intensity, depending on the intensity of the electric field.

== See also ==
- Gas-filled tube
- LED tubes – made as drop-in replacement for fluorescents
- List of light sources
- Metal-halide lamp
