= Resonant inverter =

Electrical inverters

Resonant inverters are electrical inverters based on resonant current oscillation. In series resonant inverters the resonating components and switching device are placed in series with the load to form an underdamped circuit. The current through the switching devices changes by voltage in accordance with Ohm's law due to the natural characteristics of the circuit. If the switching element is a thyristor, it is said to be self-commutated.

== Applications ==
This type of inverter produces an approximately sinusoidal waveform at a high output frequency, ranging from 20 kHz to 100 MHz, and is commonly used in relatively fixed output applications, for example, induction heating, sonar transmitters, fluorescent lighting, or ultrasonic generators. Due to the high switching frequency, the size of the resonating components is small.

== Configurations ==
There are various configurations of series resonant inverters, depending on the connections of the switching devices and load. The series inverters may be classified into two categories:

1. Series resonant inverters with unidirectional switches.
2. Series resonant inverters with bidirectional switches.

== See also ==
- Electronic oscillator
- Fluorescent lamp Inverter
