= Artcraft Fluorescent Lighting Corporation =

American manufacturing company

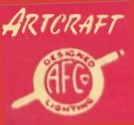
- Type: Private
- Industry: Lighting
- Founded: 1940 - 2002 (62 years)
- Founders: Louis Levy; Max Wittenberg
- Fate: Dissolved in 2002; original Corp. sold in 1968
- Headquarters: Brooklyn, New York City, New York, United States
- Number of locations: New York, NY; Philadelphia, PA; Washington, DC
- Area served: United States (mostly east of the Mississippi)
- Key people: Louis J. Levy; (President and Co-Owner); Max Wittenberg; Co-Owner - (1940 - 1953 approx.); Harry Handler; Co-Owner - (1953 approx. - 1968 approx.)
- Products: Fluorescent Fixtures, Neon Signs, Electric Fans
- Revenue: ▲US$, $50 million annually - in 2008 dollars; inflation-adjusted: In late 1940s-1950s, $2 million a year [AAA Dun & Bradstreet credit ratings]
- Number of employees: ▲200 approximately

Artcraft Fluorescent Lighting Corporation was an American mass manufacturer of fluorescent lighting fixtures from the time of the public introduction of the fluorescent lamp at the 1939 World's Fair. Artcraft was first to announce and start mass manufacturing of a liner showcase striplight fixture and slimline ballast in 1946.

Fluorescent lighting was new to consumers, businesses, and professionals, who were familiar with incandescent lighting.

The benefits of fluorescent lighting were lower operating costs, more light for the same power input, and less maintenance. The company remained in existence until about 2002 in Brooklyn, NY.

The three top fluorescent fixture manufacturing companies from the beginning were, Lightolier [Blitzer family], the largest, a division of Royal Philips Electronics, with approximately $500 million in annual sales, followed by Artcraft Fluorescent Lighting Corporation [Levy family], and Globe Lighting Products, Inc. [Waitzkin family], originating from New York City.

== Sources ==
Industrial Directory of New York State, 1949ed, 1953ed, vol. 3468, pp. 638, 684

Lighting - Interior Lighting- Artemide (Firm), vol. 63–64, 1953, p. 82

Lighting - Interior Lighting- Artemide (Firm), vol. 53–54, 1948, pp. 175, 392

Mark Stanley Rea, ed. (c. 1993), Rensselaer Polytechnic Institute, Illuminating Engineering Society of North America, New York, Part IV Lighting Applications, Lighting Handbook Reference & Application (8th ed.), pp. 517–749, ISBN 0-87995-102-8 (previous editions published under title: IES lighting handbook)

Electrical Consultant (original from Cornell University - digitized, Feb 1, 2011 - Print Advertisement) Lighting & Lamps, vol. 53, 1948, p. 21

Electrical West (original from McGraw-Hill Company of California., 1967), vol. 134, 1967

Chain Store Age - Super Markets, vol. 40, 1964, p. 64

"United States Library of Congress", Dun & Bradstreet Corporation Records (Science, Technology & Business Division), Industrial Directories, John Adams Building Collection, Located Off-site at Fort Meade, Manhattan & Bronx & Philadelphia, PA, 1945 Pg. 1481, Feb. 1st 1948, Feb. 1st 1950, Feb 1st 1951, Feb 1st 1952, Pg. 2371, Feb. 1st 1953, Feb. 1st 1954, Feb.1st 1955, Jan. 1st 1956, Jan. 1st 1957., Washington, DC, September 2016

Arthur A. Bright & Rupert Maclaurin (1943), Economic Factors Influencing The Development and Introduction of The Fluorescent Lamp, The Journal of Political Economy, Massachusetts Institute of Technology, [MIT], University of Chicago Press, vol. 51, pp. 429–450

Arthur A. Bright, Jr. (1949), The electric-lamp industry: technological change and economic development from 1800 to 1947, New York, Macmillan Co., pp. 399–417, ISBN 0-405-04690-1

Moody's Dividend Record - Moody's Investors Service, Incorporated, 1948, Artcraft Fluorescent Corp., 7% partie, pfd, 1948, p. 143

Lighting the Way, Natural museum of American History, © 2015 Smithsonian Institution.

"Eat a Sloppy Joe at Currant Cafe Sunday While You Wait For Lit Brooklyn to Open", March 14, 2014 - Bedford and Bowery, © New York Magazine., 14 March 2014

Buckley, Cara (7 May 2008), ""© New York Times - Front Page, May 7, 2008" - Previous headquarters building of Artcraft Fluorescent Corp. featured for current new use of space of building."", The New York Times

"© New York Times, May 7, 2008, Front Page reprint"

""Slide-Show" - Related Article to © New York Times, May 7, 2008 - Previous headquarters building.", The New York Times, 8 May 2008
