= ArtCraft =

Open-source creative software suite

- PhotoCraft 0.9.0 running on Windows 11
- Original author: Brandon Thomas
- Developers: StoryTeller AI and ArtCraft community
- Release: October 7, 2026; 45 days ago
- Written in: Rust
- Engine: CraftUI (bespoke)
- Operating system: macOS, Windows, Linux, FreeBSD
- Platform: Windows, Linux, Mac, Android
- Available in: English and others
- Type: Graphics software, Office suite, CAD suite
- License: MIT or Apache 2.0
- Website: getartcraft.com/apps
- Repository: github.com/storytold

ArtCraft Crafting Apps (sometimes Craft Apps, often referred to simply as ArtCraft) are a suite of open-source applications intended to resemble and replace programs in the Adobe Creative Cloud suite, as well as Microsoft's Office suite. The applications cover creative areas such as image editing, video editing, and PDF document handling, as well as office-related areas such as word processing, presentations, and spreadsheets.

The suite gained attention after its creator, software developer Brandon Thomas, said he created it using Claude Opus 5.5.

The project has received extensive coverage not limited to technology-related outlets, particularly relating LLM usage and Vibe coding, its effects on paid software, as well as tensions over Adobe's pricing practices.

== History ==
The project was released on October 7, 2026 by Atlanta-based software engineer Brandon Thomas, who said he had grown frustrated with cancellation fees on Adobe subscriptions. He said the apps were written with Claude Opus 5.5 and described the process as vibe coding, while also stating he had used Rust, the language the suite is written in, for about a decade. Thomas described the apps as clean-room implementations and built from public file-format specifications rather than Adobe's source code.

Days after its release, the suite was extended to include some programs that resemble Microsoft's Office suite.

== Development ==
The American software developer Brandon Thomas of Atlanta developed clones of Adobe programs such as Photoshop, Illustrator, Lightroom and Premiere Pro within a very short time, using the AI model Claude Opus 5.5 and the Rust programming language. Thomas describes the programs as "clean-room replacements": their behavior was reproduced, in part on the basis of published document format specifications, and no source code was copied.

The project was motivated by Adobe's cancellation fees. In June 2024, the United States government sued the company over concealed fees charged for canceling annual subscriptions; the case was settled in March 2026, with Adobe agreeing to pay US$150 million.

As of November 2026, five of the applications were labeled early alpha and the other twelve were listed as in development. Large parts of the code were generated iteratively with AI agents, which has led to rapid development but also to early alpha versions with the teething problems that entails. The applications are released under free licenses and can be used free of charge; the project is to be funded through optional AI tokens that users can purchase to add the corresponding AI features.

== Technical features ==
The ArtCraft applications are designed for desktop use on Windows, macOS and Linux. Several of them are also offered in versions that run in a web browser using WebAssembly.

According to the project, its applications are written in Rust, and their native desktop versions rely on neither Electron nor embedded web views. Rust was chosen in part to reduce the risk of memory errors. The project also emphasizes local file processing.

Unlike the products they are modeled on, every command button and menu item can be operated remotely both by humans and by AI assistants via the Model Context Protocol (MCP). For example, a user could ask an AI to create a chart from a table of figures; the AI assistant could then control GridCraft remotely and check the result.

== Applications ==
ArtCraft applications and comparable established products
Icon	Product	Description	Similar to
	PhotoCraft	Raster graphics editor	Adobe Photoshop
	VectorCraft	Vector graphics editor	Adobe Illustrator
	FilmCraft	Video editor	Adobe Premiere Pro
	LightCraft	Photo editing and management software	Adobe Lightroom
	PdfCraft	PDF viewer and editor	Adobe Acrobat
	EffectCraft	Motion graphic design software	Adobe After Effects
	AniCraft	2D vector animation software	Adobe Animate
	DesignCraft	Desktop publishing software	Adobe InDesign
	FigCraft	User interface design software	Figma
	TextureCraft	3D texture editor	Adobe Substance 3D (Substance Painter)
	MaterialCraft	Physically based rendering material editor	Adobe Substance 3D (Substance Designer)
	WordCraft	Word processing software	Microsoft Word
	SoundCraft	Digital audio workstation	Pro Tools Adobe Audition
	DeckCraft	Presentation software	Microsoft PowerPoint
	CADCraft	Computer-aided design software	AutoCAD
	GridCraft	Spreadsheet editor	Microsoft Excel
	Craft Anything	AI-assisted reverse engineering tool	development tool used to develop ArtCraft Suite, released for public use
	AutoCraft	AI-assisted software development tool	issue triage and development lifecycle tool used to develop ArtCraft Suite, released for public use
	ArtCraft Studio	Provides inclusive AI Generation for 2D images, video and audio, and 3D objects.	

== Reception ==
At release, early hands-on coverage found PhotoCraft usable for basic edits, but unreliable for professional work.

Digital Trends pointed out the project's ambition and its more than 200 individual contributors as an indication that AI could let more people build their own alternatives to subscription software. Al Jazeera English suggested free substitutes like ArtCraft could make paid software less profitable.

== See also ==
- Affinity
- DaVinci Resolve
- Capture One
- Clean-room design
- Vibe coding
