= Wood's anomaly =

Anomalous diffraction at metallic gratings

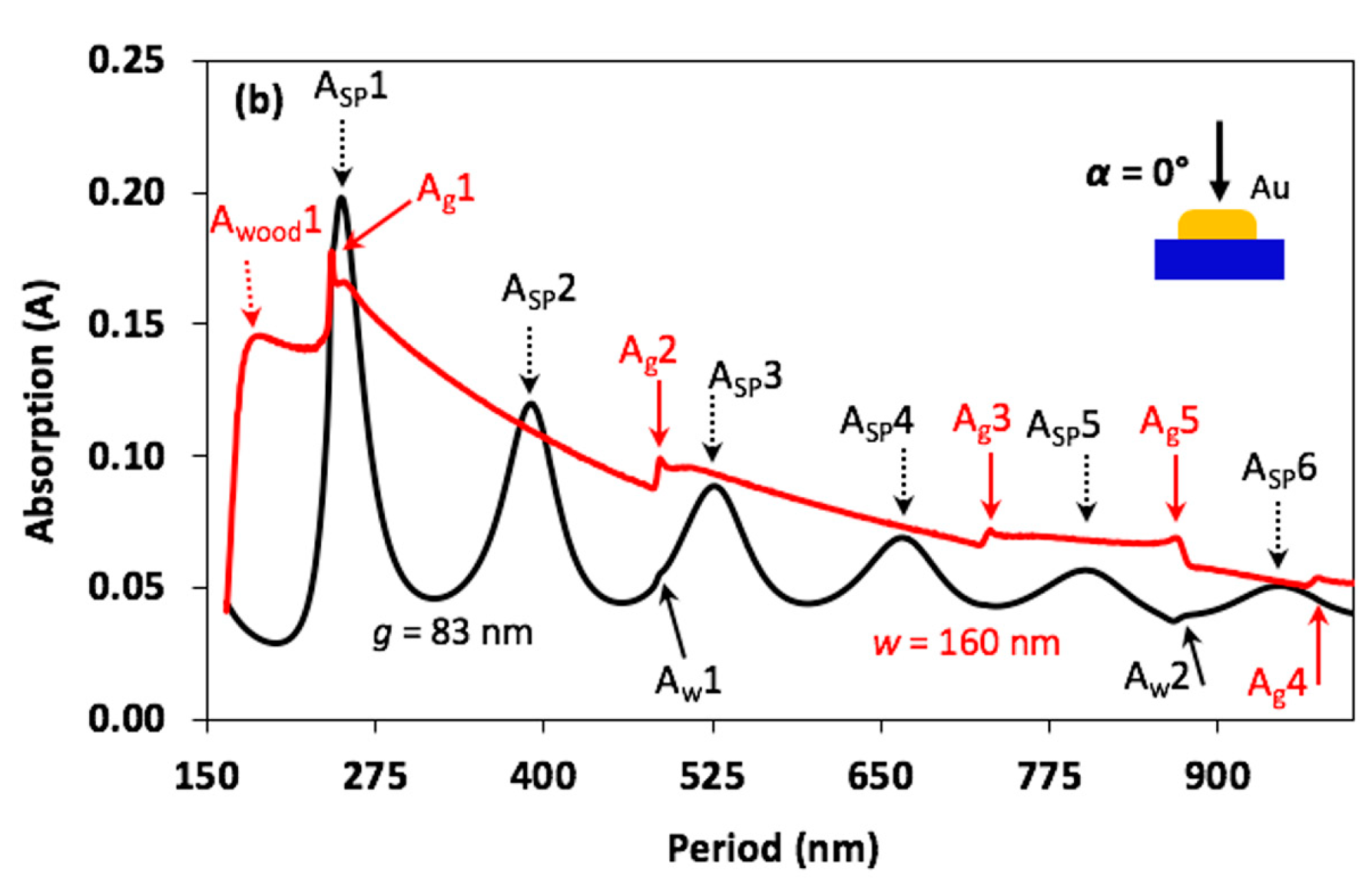
Absorbance of a 1D metallo-dielectric grating with respect to slit width (red) and gold nanowire width (black), which shows the emergence of Wood anomalies.

In optics, Wood's anomaly refers to the rapid variation of light intensity at diffracted spectral orders in metallic gratings. It was first observed by American physicist Robert W. Wood in 1902. Initially unexplained by conventional grating theories, the effect was later understood to arise partly from the excitation of surface plasmon polaritons at the grating surface and partly from the coupling of incident light into diffracted orders, one of which becomes evanescent at a grazing angle. The latter effect is also known as Rayleigh anomaly or Rayleigh–Wood anomaly, after Lord Rayleigh's 1907 work on gratings.

Studies on Wood anomalies acted as a progenitor to the fields of plasmonics and metamaterials. Wood anomalies were also observed in acoustic gratings, where they were associated both with diffracted waves at a grazing incidence and surface acoustic waves.

== Background and history ==
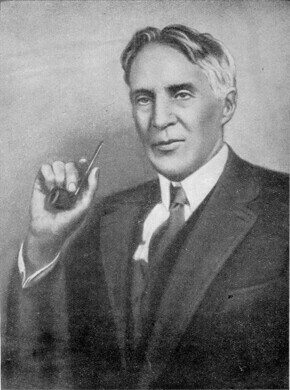
Wood c. 1910

In 1902, Wood studied the spectra of a continuous light source reflected from a metallic surface with periodically-etched grooves. He observed abrupt changes in reflected light intensity under certain conditions, such as sharp drops in reflectance within a range of wavelengths shorter than the distance between the spectral lines of sodium. These anomalous results could not be explained by grating theories of that period. Wood reported further studies on this anomaly in 1912 and 1935.

In 1907, Lord Rayleigh developed a dynamic theory of wave diffraction from a perfectly-conducting grating using Fourier series. He attributed this anomaly to the passing-off of a diffraction order, at which one of the refracted field harmonics emerges at a grazing angle to the grating and becomes evanescent. In 1941, Ugo Fano reexamined the effect by incorporating the complex refractive index of the grating, which led to the identification of a surface wave mode contributing to the anomaly. This wave was later revealed to be a surface plasmon polariton (SPP). The properties of these surface wave modes were later studied by A. Hessel and Arthur A. Oliner in 1965, who provided a comprehensive new theory and identified the contributing leaky wave behavior. The surface wave modes were explicitly identified as surface plasmon polaritons in the 1960s. The anomalies were further studied and identified in two-dimensional periodic structures and were found to play a part in extraordinary optical transmission phenomenon.

== Mathematical formulation ==
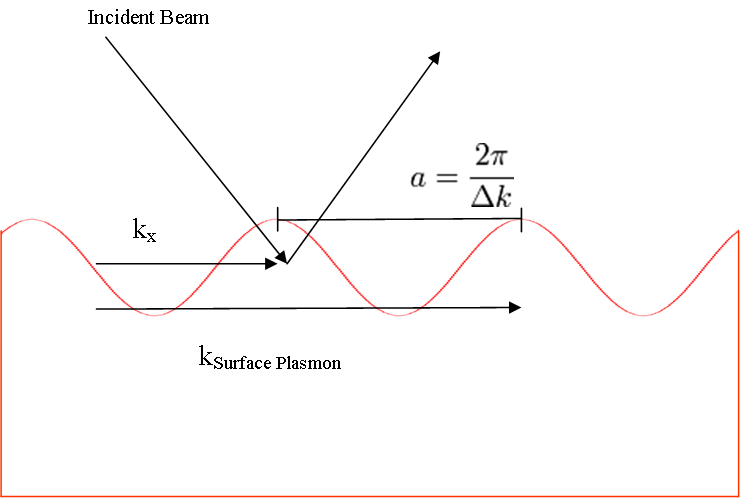
Phase matching of surface plasmon polaritons on a sinusoidal grating

A rigorous theory of Wood anomalies can be developed by invoking Bloch's theorem and expanding electromagnetic fields as spatial harmonics, whose boundary conditions are enforced at the grating surface. Nevertheless, an approximate yet simpler approach can be taken for one-dimensional shallow gratings through the phase matching condition. Assuming that the grating thickness is vanishingly small and thus the SPP mode is not significantly perturbed, the following resonance condition for Wood anomalies can be obtained:

$$\text{Re}\left[ \beta_{\text{SPP}}(\omega) \right] \approx k_{x,inc} + \frac{2\pi}{a}$$
$$\beta_{\text{SPP}}(\omega)=\frac{\omega}{c} \sqrt{\frac{\varepsilon_m(\omega)\varepsilon_d}{\varepsilon_m(\omega)+\varepsilon_d}}$$

where

- $\omega$ is the angular frequency of the light.
- $\beta_{\text{SPP}}$ is the SPP propagation constant.
- $\varepsilon_m(\omega)$ is the frequency-dependent complex dielectric constant of metal.
- $\varepsilon_d$ is the dielectric constant of the dielectric half-space above the grating.
- $k_{x,inc}=\frac{\omega}{c} \sin\theta$ is the transverse wavevector of a plane wave with an angle of incidence $\theta$.
- $a$ is the grating period.

In turn, the conditions for Rayleigh anomalies can be represented in a much simpler form, in analogy with the Bragg's law:

$$k_{x,inc} = m \frac{2\pi}{a}$$

where $m$ is an integer.

== See also ==
- Bragg's law
- Electromagnetic metasurface
- Extraordinary optical transmission
- Frequency selective surface
- Photonic crystal
- Spoof surface plasmon
