= Blacklight poster =

Type of wall art

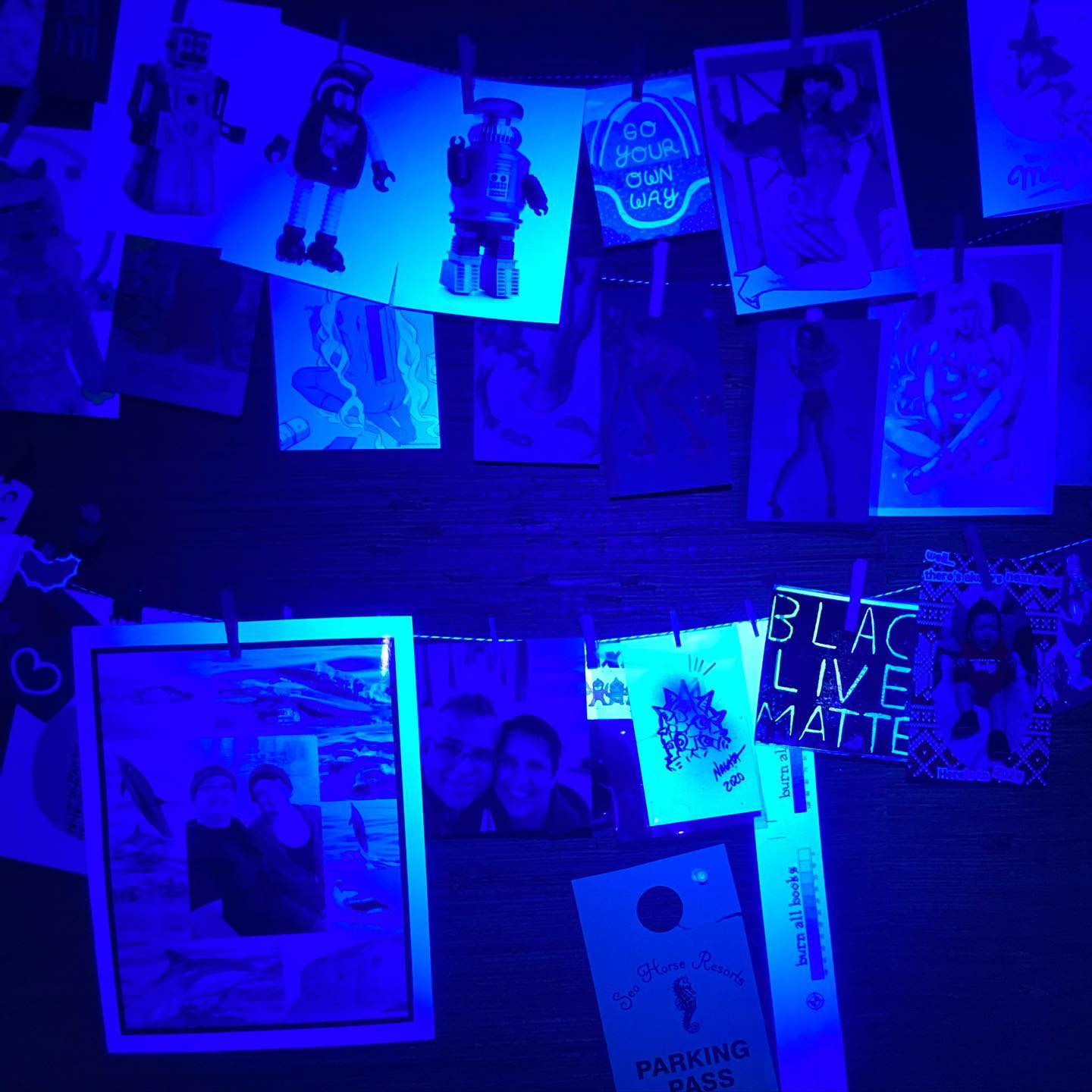
Pictures with messages visible under blacklight

A blacklight poster or black light poster is a poster printed with inks which fluoresce under a blacklight. The inks used contain phosphors which cause them to glow when exposed to ultraviolet light emitted from blacklights.

== History ==
=== Early development ===
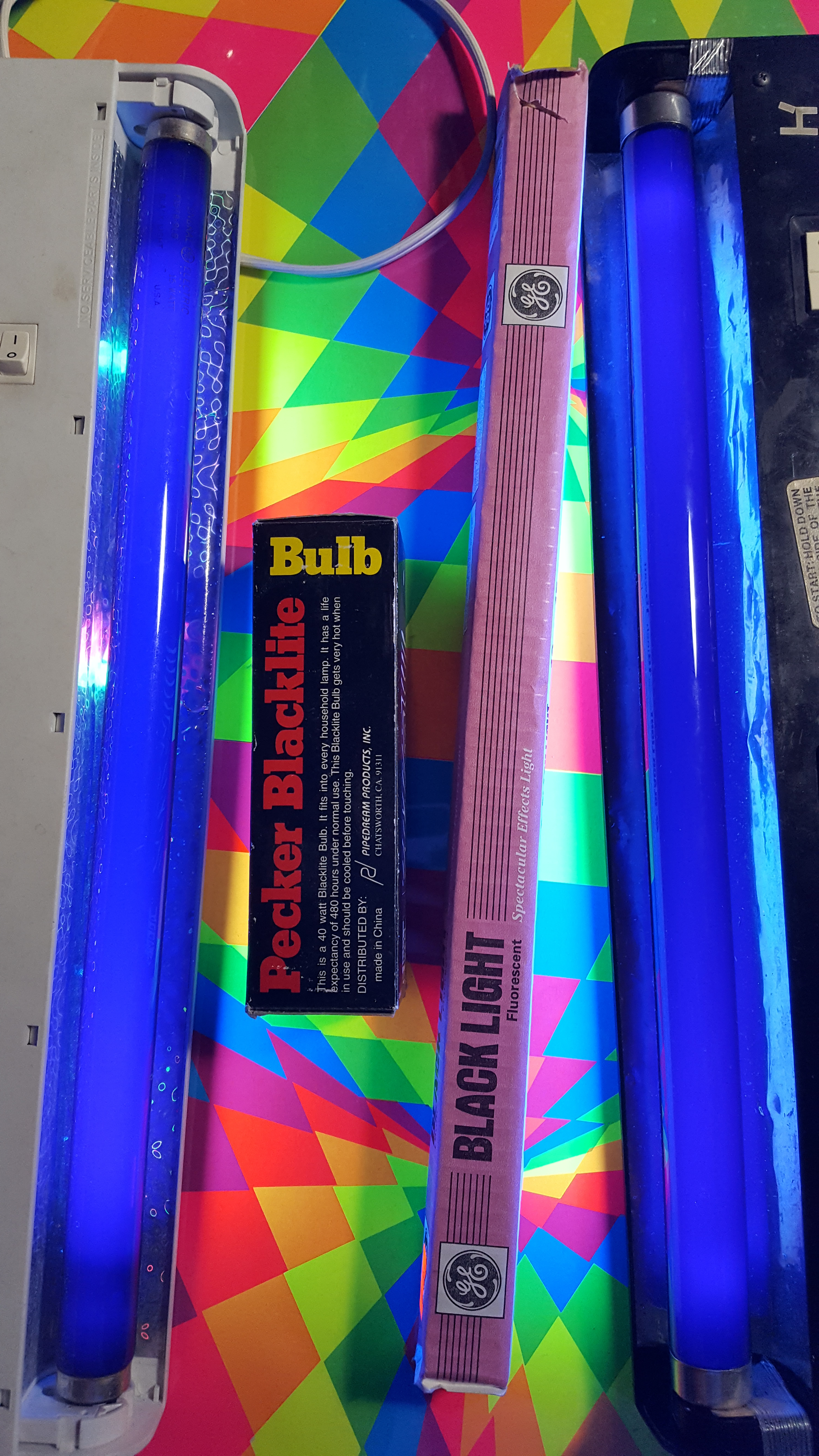
Two examples of fluorescent blacklight bulbs with light fixtures and packaging and a novelty incandescent bulb

In 1903, the development of blacklight technology began with the development of Wood's glass, an optical filter glass that allows only UV and infrared light to pass through.

In 1932, the Switzer brothers developed fluorescent ink, when they were inspired by a Popular Science magazine article to experiment in their father's pharmacy. Their Day-Glo Color Corp. marketed the ink chiefly to the military, well before the 1960s counterculture emerged to embrace the aesthetic.

=== Counterculture era ===
In the 1960s, use of recreational drugs became pervasive, especially mass use of hallucinogenics such as LSD (lysergic acid diethylamide), mescaline, and marijuana for the first time.

Between 1967 and 1969, blacklight posters emerged in the United States as part of the psychedelic fashion scene.

With the ability to glow and vibrate under ultraviolet light, blacklight posters could simulate the sensations and visual distortions experienced during an acid trip.

The style was popular in advertisements for concerts at venues like the Fillmore and Avalon Ballroom, and further promoted and commercialized by companies like Pandora Productions (established in Minneapolis, 1964) and the Houston Black Light Company (Houston, 1969). Designs ranged from respectful copies of concert posters to prurient adolescent fantasies.

At its height, radical black artists found inspiration in the aesthetic, such as Faith Ringgold's series of Black Light paintings (1967-1969) that eschewed any white pigment, or Barbara Jones-Hogu's prints (especially Relate to Your Heritage). Commercial producers reciprocated by incorporating blaxploitation themes into their posters, as in George Goode's series for the Houston Black Light Company and George Stowe Jr.'s work for One Stop Posters.

=== Decline and revival ===
Since the 1960s and 1970s, the art form of blacklight posters has gone out of fashion and is generally viewed as a relic of the era.

Since 2007, blacklight posters, which have continued to be produced since the 1960s, have resurged in popularity, as blacklight and glow-in-the-dark parties have become more popular.

As of 2014, a number of companies have been producing new and classic flocked blacklight posters in a wide range of content, including music, nature, and pop culture. The black parts of these posters are overlaid with black flocking, giving them a velvet feel, so they are often referred to as velvet posters.

Artists continue to make use of the material, notably Dorothy Cross's Ghost Ship (1998), a decommissioned light ship painted to glow at night, evoking the pigment's original military purposes, as well as Hank Willis Thomas's screenprints And I Can't Run (2014) and Blow the Man Down (2014), exposing black victims under fluorescent light, evoking the pigment's historic association with black radicalism.

== See also ==
- Concert poster
- Psychedelic art
- Counterculture of the 1960s
