= Arthur Cheney Train =

American writer (1875–1945)

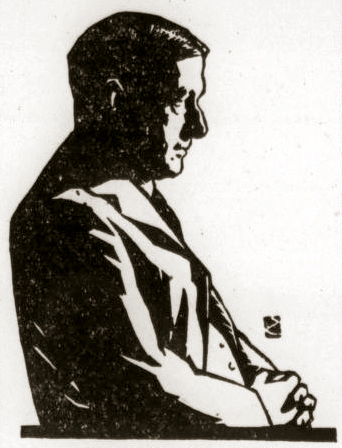
- Woodcut by Bertrand Zadig (1926)
- Born: September 6, 1875; Boston, Massachusetts, U.S.
- Died: December 22, 1945 (aged 70); New York City, New York, U.S.
- Education: St. Paul's School
- Alma mater: Harvard University; Harvard Law School
- Occupations: Lawyer; writer
- Spouses: Ethel Kissam (m. 1897; died 1923) Helen Coster Gerard (m. 1926)
- Children: 5, including John
- Parent(s): Charles Russell Train; Sara Maria Cheney

Arthur Cheney Train (September 6, 1875 – December 22, 1945), also called Arthur Chesney Train, was an American lawyer and writer of legal thrillers, particularly known for his novels of courtroom intrigue and the creation of the fictional lawyer Mr. Ephraim Tutt.

== Early life ==
Train was born in Boston, Massachusetts on September 6, 1875. His father was lawyer Charles Russell Train, who served for many years as attorney general of Massachusetts, and his mother was Sara Maria Cheney. His much older half-brother was Rear Admiral Charles Jackson Train.

After attending St. Paul's School in Concord, New Hampshire, Train graduated with a BA from Harvard University in 1896 and LLB from Harvard Law School in 1899.

== Career ==
Photograph of Train, c. 1930

In January 1901, Train became assistant in the office of the New York County District Attorney. In 1904 he started his literary career with the publication of the short story "The Maximilian Diamond" in Leslie's Monthly. He ran the two careers in parallel until 1908 when he left the District Attorney's office to open a general law practice in the Mutual Life Building at 34 Nassau Street in New York City. His 1907 novel, Mortmain, was one of the earliest works in the alien hand syndrome genre and was adapted into a 1915 film of the same name that is now lost. Several other works by Train were filmed, including Illusion (1929), His Children's Children (1923), and The Blind Goddess (1926).

In 1912, Train, who as a former assistant to New York County District Attorney William Travers Jerome had dealt with Italian criminals who emigrated to the United States and the Black Hand, attended the Cuocolo Trial in Italy against the Camorra, studying that Mafia-type organisation and the functioning of Italian justice.

From 1915 to 1922, Train was in private practice as a lawyer with Charles Albert Perkins while continuing to write, not just novels but short stories, plays, and journalism. In 1919, he created the popular character of Mr. Ephraim Tutt, a wily old lawyer who supported the common man and always had a trick up his sleeve to right the law's injustices.

Train wrote dozens of stories about Tutt in the Saturday Evening Post. The fictional Ephraim Tutt became "the best known lawyer in America," particularly after the appearance of Yankee Lawyer, an immensely popular book that purported to be Tutt's autobiography. Train also coauthored two science fiction novels with eminent physicist Robert W. Wood. After 1922, he devoted himself to writing.

== Personal life ==
In 1897, Train married Ethel Kissam (1876–1923). Ethel was the daughter of Benjamin Kissam and Lucy (née Warren) Kissam, the niece of Maria (née Kissam) Vanderbilt and the first cousin of William, Cornelius, Margaret, Emily, Florence, Frederick, Eliza, and George Washington Vanderbilt II. Together, they had four children, including Namesake Arthur Kissam Train.

Ethel died in 1923 and Train married Helen Coster Gerard in 1926, with whom he had one child John Train.

Train died on December 22, 1945, in New York City.

== Bibliography ==
- Train, A. C. (1905). McAllister and his Double. New York: Charles Scribner's Sons.
- Train, A. C. (1907). Mortmain. New York: Charles Scribner's Sons.
- Train, A. C. (2006) [1908]. True Stories of Crime from the District Attorney's Office. Echo Library. ISBN 1406810711.
- Train, A. C. (2005) [1908]. True Stories of Celebrated Crimes from the District Attorney's Office. Kessinger Publishing. ISBN 0766197271.
- Train, A. C. (1911). The Confessions of Artemas Quibble. New York: Charles Scribner's Sons.
- Train, A. C. (1912). Courts, Criminals and the Camorra. New York: Charles Scribner's Sons.
- Train, A. C. (1912). "C Q", or, In the Wireless House. New York: The Century Co.
- Train, A. C. & Wood, R. W. (1915). The Man Who Rocked the Earth. Garden City: Doubleday, Page & Co.
- Train, A. C. & Wood, R. W. (1916). The Moon Maker. Garden City: Doubleday, Page & Co.
- Train, A. C. (1914). The "Goldfish", Being the Confessions of a Successful Man. New York: The Century Co.
- Train, A. C. (1918). The Earthquake. New York: Charles Scribner's Sons. Describes the shock to ordinary life following America's entry into the First World War.
- Train, A. C. (2005) [1919]. Tutt and Mr. Tutt. Alan Rodgers Books. ISBN 1598186647.
- Train, A. C. (1919). By Advice of Counsel (2nd. Mr. Tutt novel). The Curtis Publishing Co.
- "The Dog Andrew, Part 1" (PDF). Saturday Evening Post (November 15, 1919), reprinted in The Green Bag (Winter 2017).
- "The Dog Andrew, Part 2" (PDF). Saturday Evening Post (November 15, 1919), reprinted in The Green Bag (Spring 2017).
- Train, A. C. (1920). The Hermit Of Turkey Hollow. (3rd. Mr. Tutt novel) The Curtis Publishing Co.
- Train, Arthur (1922). Courts and Criminals. New York, N.Y.: Charles Scribner's Sons. OCLC 418407.
- Train, A. C. (1923a). His Children's Children. New York: Charles Scribner's Sons.
- Train, A. C. (1923b). Tut, Tut! Mr. Tutt. New York: Charles Scribner's Sons.
- Train, A. C. (1924). The Needle's Eye. New York: Charles Scribner's Sons.
- Train, A. C. (1925). The Blind Goddess. New York: Charles Scribner's Sons.
- Train, A. C. (1926). Page Mr. Tutt. New York: Charles Scribner's Sons.
- Train, A. C. (1927). When Tutt Meets Tutt. New York: Charles Scribner's Sons.
- Train, A. C. (1928). The Horns of Ramadan. New York: Charles Scribner's Sons.
- Train, A. C. (2005) [1928]. Ambition. Kessinger Publishing. ISBN 1417934050.
- Train, A. C. (1929). Illusion. New York: Charles Scribner's Sons.
- Train, A. C. (1930). The Adventures of Ephraim Tutt, Attorney and Counsellor-at-Law. New York: Charles Scribner's Sons.
- Train, A. C. (1930). Paper Profits: A Novel of Wall Street. New York.
- Train, A. C. (1934). Tutt for Tutt. New York: Charles Scribner's Sons.
- Train, A. C. (1936). Mr. Tutt Takes the Stand. New York: Charles Scribner's Sons.
- Train, A. C. (1937). Mr. Tutt's Case Book Being a Collection of His Most Celebrated Trials as Reported and Compiled. New York: Charles Scribner's Sons.
- Train, A. C. (1939). My Day in Court. New York: Charles Scribner's Sons.
- Train, A. C. (1940). Tassels On Her Boots. New York: Charles Scribner's Sons.
- Train, A. C. (1941). Mr. Tutt Comes Home. New York: Charles Scribner's Sons.
- Train, A. C. (1943). Yankee lawyer: The Autobiography of Ephraim Tutt. New York: Charles Scribner's Sons.
- Train, A. C. (1945). Mr. Tutt Finds a Way. New York: Charles Scribner's Sons.
- Train, A. C. (1961). Mr. Tutt at his Best: A Collection of his Most Famous Cases. Kessinger Publishing.
