= The Man Who Rocked the Earth =

1915 novel by Robert Williams Wood

- No image yet
- Author: Arthur C. Train & Robert W. Wood
- Language: English
- Published: 1915 (Doubleday, Page, Garden City, N. Y.)
- Publication place: United States
- Media type: Print (paperback)
- Pages: 0
- ISBN: 0-405-06315-6

The Man Who Rocked the Earth is a science fiction novel written in 1915 by Arthur C. Train and Robert W. Wood. It is notable for describing what an atomic detonation would look like in 1915, thirty years before the United States detonated the first atomic bomb.
