= Blacklight =

Light fixture that emits long-wave ultraviolet light and very little visible light

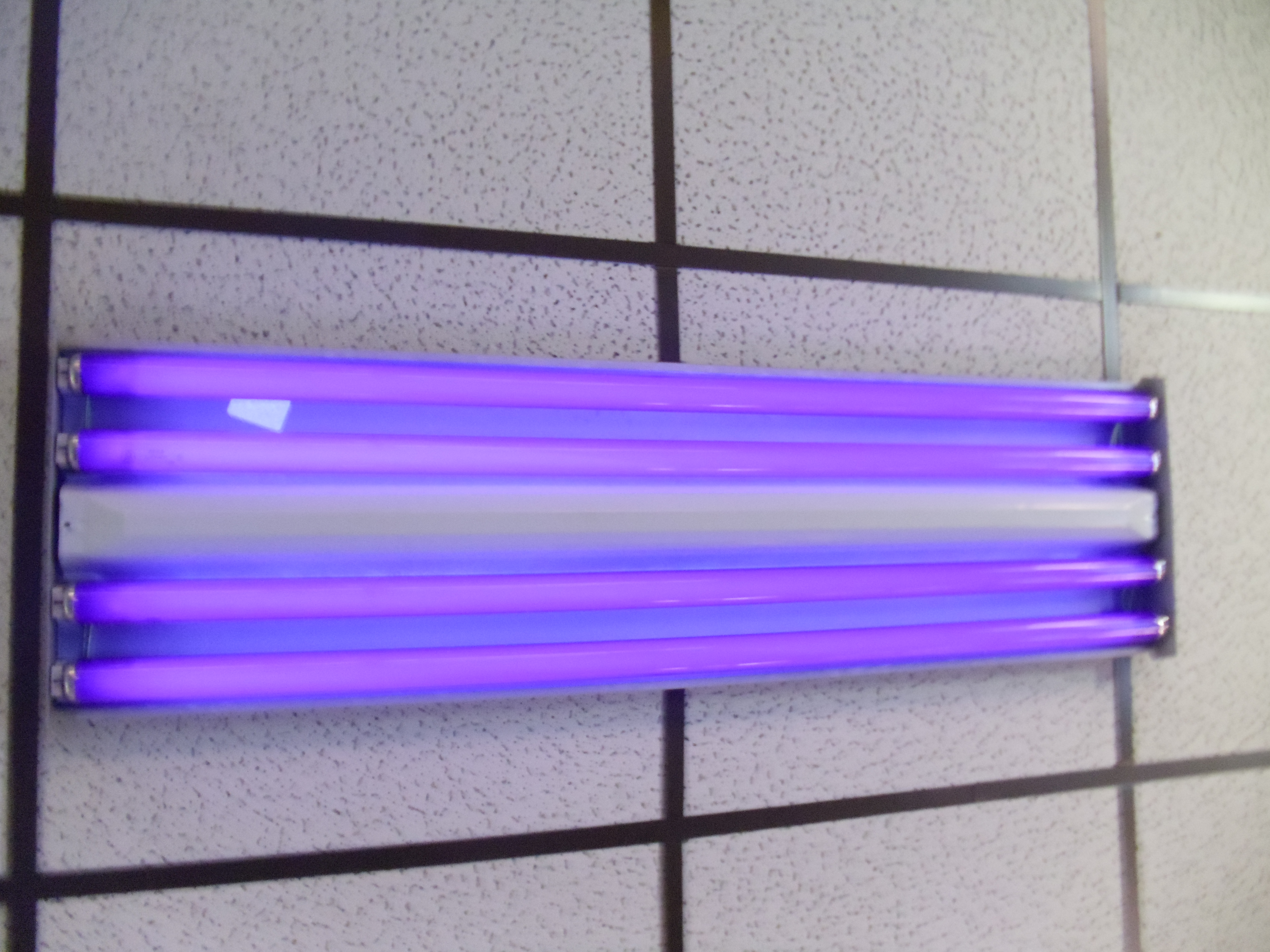
Blacklight fluorescent tubes – the violet glow of a blacklight is not the UV light itself, but visible violet light that escapes being filtered out by the filter material in the glass envelope

A blacklight, also called a UV-A light, Wood's lamp, or ultraviolet light, is a lamp that emits long-wave (UV-A) ultraviolet light and very little visible light. One type of lamp has a violet filter material, either on the bulb or in a separate glass filter in the lamp housing, which blocks most visible light and allows through UV, so the lamp has a dim violet glow when operating. Blacklight lamps which have this filter have a lighting industry designation that includes the letters BLB ("blacklight blue"). A second type of lamp produces ultraviolet but does not have the filter material, so it produces more visible light and has a blue color when operating. These tubes are made for use in "bug zapper" insect traps, and are identified by the industry designation BL ("blacklight").

Blacklight sources may be specially designed fluorescent lamps, mercury-vapor lamps, light-emitting diodes (LEDs), lasers, or incandescent lamps. In medicine, forensics, and some other scientific fields, such a light source is referred to as a Wood's lamp, named after Robert Williams Wood, who invented the original Wood's glass UV filters.

Although many other types of lamp emit ultraviolet light with visible light, blacklights are essential when UV-A light without visible light is needed, particularly in observing fluorescence, the colored glow that many substances emit when exposed to UV. They are employed for decorative and artistic lighting effects, diagnostic and therapeutic uses in medicine, the detection of substances tagged with fluorescent dyes, rock-hunting, scorpion-hunting, the detection of counterfeit money, the curing of plastic resins, attracting insects and the detection of refrigerant leaks affecting refrigerators and air conditioning systems. Strong sources of long-wave ultraviolet light are used in tanning beds.

== Medical hazard ==
UV-A presents a potential hazard when eyes and skin are exposed, especially to high power sources. According to the World Health Organization, UV-A is responsible for the initial tanning of skin and it contributes to skin ageing and wrinkling. UV-A may also contribute to the progression of skin cancers. Additionally, UV-A can have negative effects on eyes in both the short-term and long-term. However, there is little evidence that blacklight products with wavelengths above 350 nanometres and designed for domestic uses and intensities have any adverse health effects.

== Types ==
=== Fluorescent ===
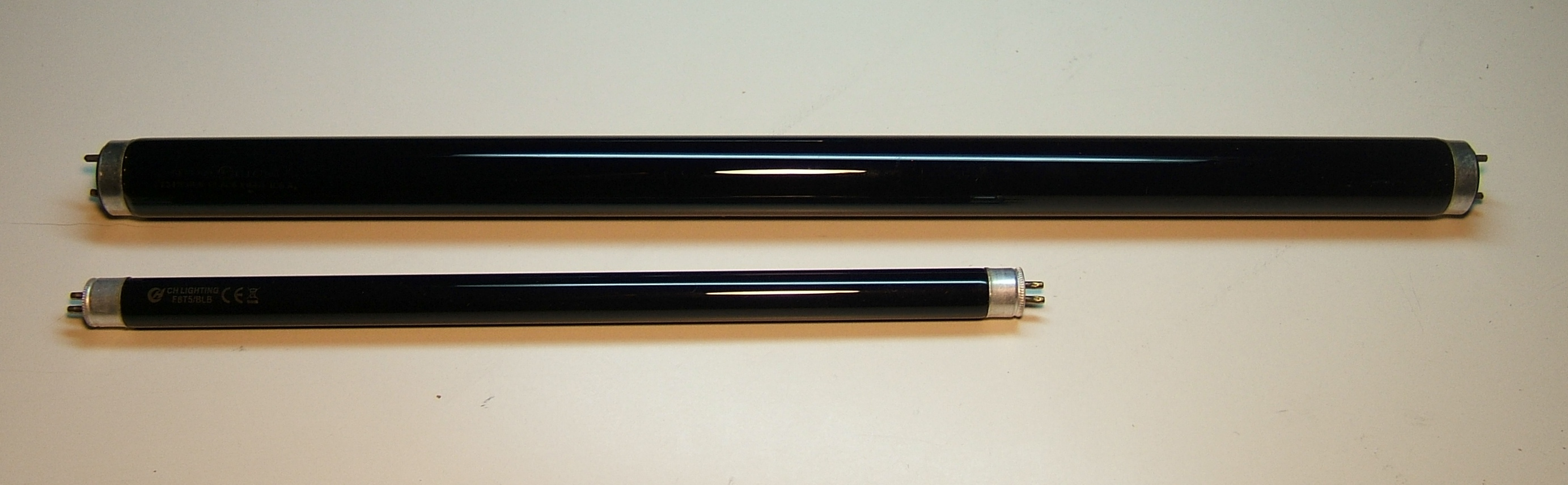
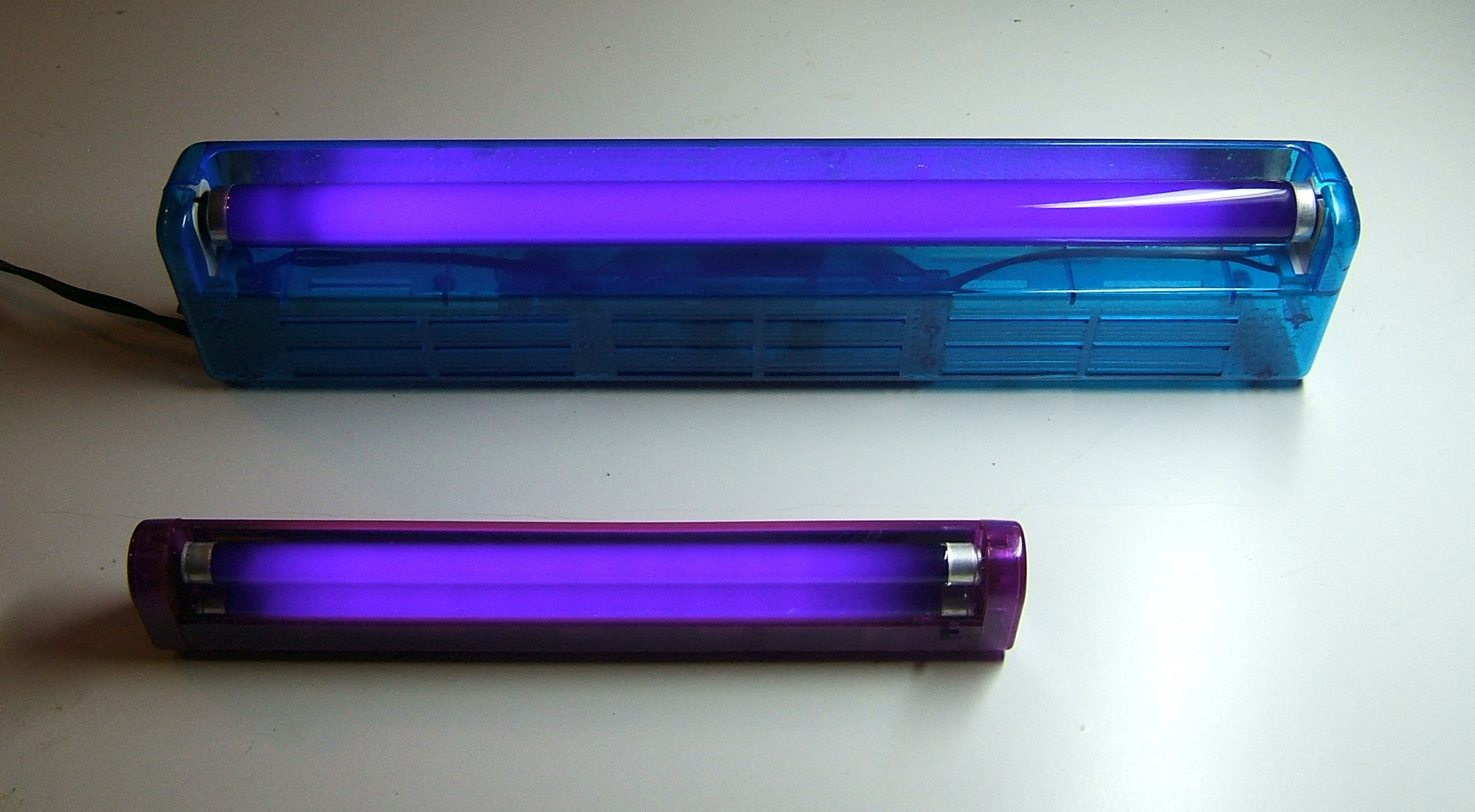
Two blacklight fluorescent tubes, showing use. The top is a F15T8/BLB 18-inch, 15-watt tube, used in a standard plug-in fluorescent fixture. The bottom is an F8T5/BLB 12-inch, 8-watt tube, used in a portable battery-powered blacklight sold as a pet urine detector.

Fluorescent blacklight tubes are typically made in the same fashion as normal fluorescent tubes except that a phosphor that emits UVA light instead of visible white light is used on the inside of the tube. The type most commonly used for blacklights, designated blacklight blue or "BLB" by the industry, has a dark blue filter coating on the tube, which filters out most visible light, so that fluorescence effects can be observed. These tubes have a dim violet glow when operating. They should not be confused with "blacklight" or "BL" tubes, which have no filter coating, and have a brighter blue color (see below). These are made for use in "bug zapper" insect traps where the emission of visible light does not interfere with the performance of the product.

The phosphor typically used for a near 368 to 371 nanometer emission peak is either europium-doped strontium borofluoride (SrB_{2}F_{8}:Eu^{2+}) or europium-doped strontium borate (Sr_{3}B_{2}O_{6}:Eu^{2+}) while the phosphor used to produce a peak around 350 to 353 nanometres is lead-doped barium silicate (BaSi_{2}O_{5}:Pb^{+}). A commonly-cited peak for "BLB" lamps, regardless of the type, is 365 nm.

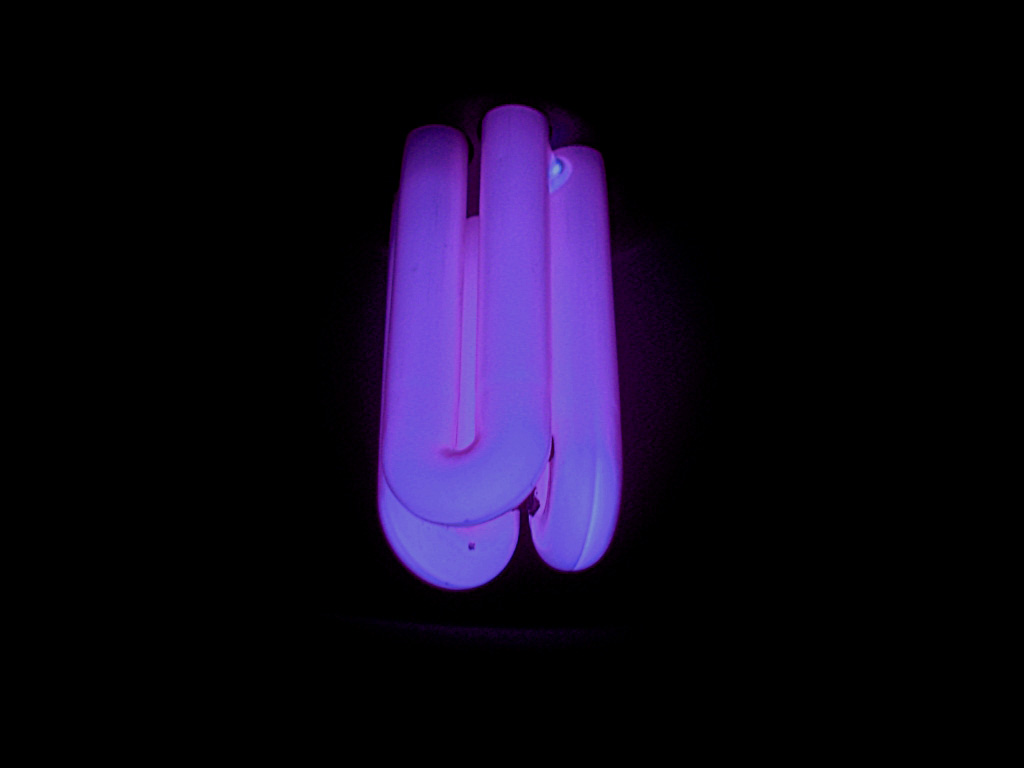
Compact fluorescent blacklight bulb

Manufacturers use different numbering systems for blacklight tubes. Philips' is becoming outdated (as of 2010), while the (German) Osram system is becoming dominant outside North America. The following table lists the tubes generating blue, UVA and UVB, in order of decreasing wavelength of the most intense peak. (Note: Compiled from various Philips, Osram, and Sylvania lighting catalogues.) Approximate phosphor compositions, major manufacturer's type numbers and some uses are given as an overview of the types available. "Peak" position is approximated to the nearest 10 nm. "Width" is the measure between points on the shoulders of the peak that represent 50% intensity: the full width at half maximum (FWHM).

Various phosphor compositions used in blacklight
Phosphor Mixture	Peak (nm)	Width (nm)	Filter	Philips suffix	Osram suffix	U.S. Type	Typical use
—	450	50	No	—	/71	—	hyperbilirubinaemia, polymerization
SrP_{2}O_{7}:Eu	420	30	No	/03	/72	—	photochemical polymerization
SrB_{4}O_{7}:Eu	370 (Note: Wood's glass tubes manufactured by Osram use a fairly narrow-band emitting phosphor, europium-activated strontium pyroborate (SrB_{4}O_{7}:Eu) with a peak at about 370 nm, whereas North American and Philips Wood's glass tubes use lead-activated calcium metasilicate that emits a wider band with a shorter wavelength peak at about 350 nm. These two types seem to be the most commonly used. Different manufacturers offer either one or the other and sometimes both.)	20	Yes (Note: BLB fluorescent lamps tend to run with efficiencies in the 25% range, with an example being a Phillips 40 W BLB T12 lamp emitting 9.8 W of UVA for 39 watts of power input.)	/08	/73	("BLB")	forensics, lapidary, night clubs
SrB_{4}O_{7}:Eu	370	20	No	—	/78	("BY")	insect attraction, polymerization, psoriasis, tanning beds
BaSi_{2}O_{5}:Pb	350	40	Yes	/08	—	"BLB"	dermatology, lapidary, forensics, night clubs
BaSi_{2}O_{5}:Pb	350	40	No	/09	/79	"BL"	insect attraction, tanning beds
SrAl_{11}O_{18}:Ce	340	30	No	—	—	—	photochemistry
MgSrAl_{10}O_{17}:Ce	310	40	No	—	—	—	medical applications, polymerization

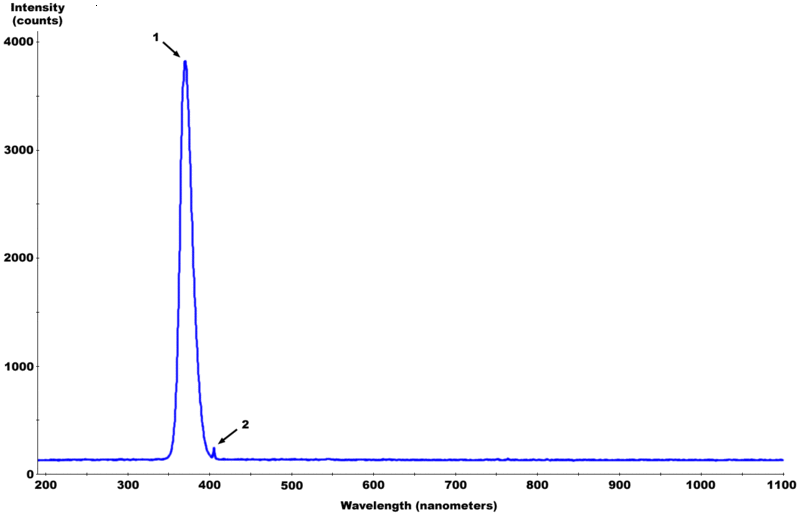
Spectrum of a blacklight fluorescent tube. FWHM spectral bandwidth of the 370 nm peak is about 20 nm. The tiny secondary peak (2) is light from the mercury vapor line at 404 nm leaking through the filter, which gives the lamp its purple glow.

==== Bug zappers ====
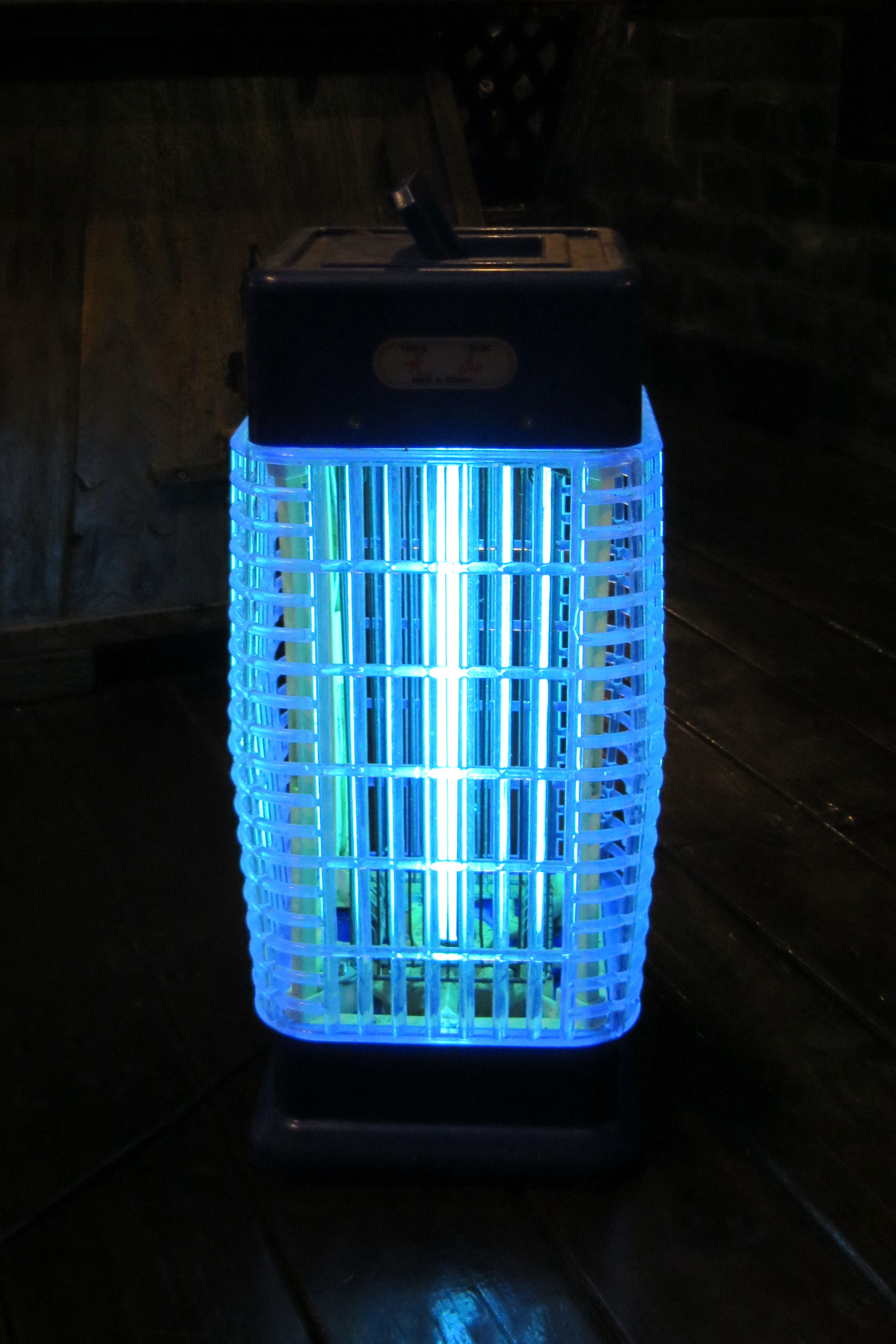
A bug zapper

Another class of UV fluorescent bulb is designed for use in bug zappers. Insects are attracted to the UV light, which they are able to see, and are then electrocuted by the device. These bulbs use the same UV-A emitting phosphor blend as the filtered blacklight, but since they do not need to suppress visible light output, they do not use a purple filter material in the bulb. Plain glass blocks out less of the visible mercury emission spectrum, making them appear light blue-violet to the naked eye. These lamps are referred to by the designation "blacklight" or "BL" in some North American lighting catalogs. These types are not suitable for applications which require the low visible light output of "BLB" tubes lamps.

=== Incandescent ===
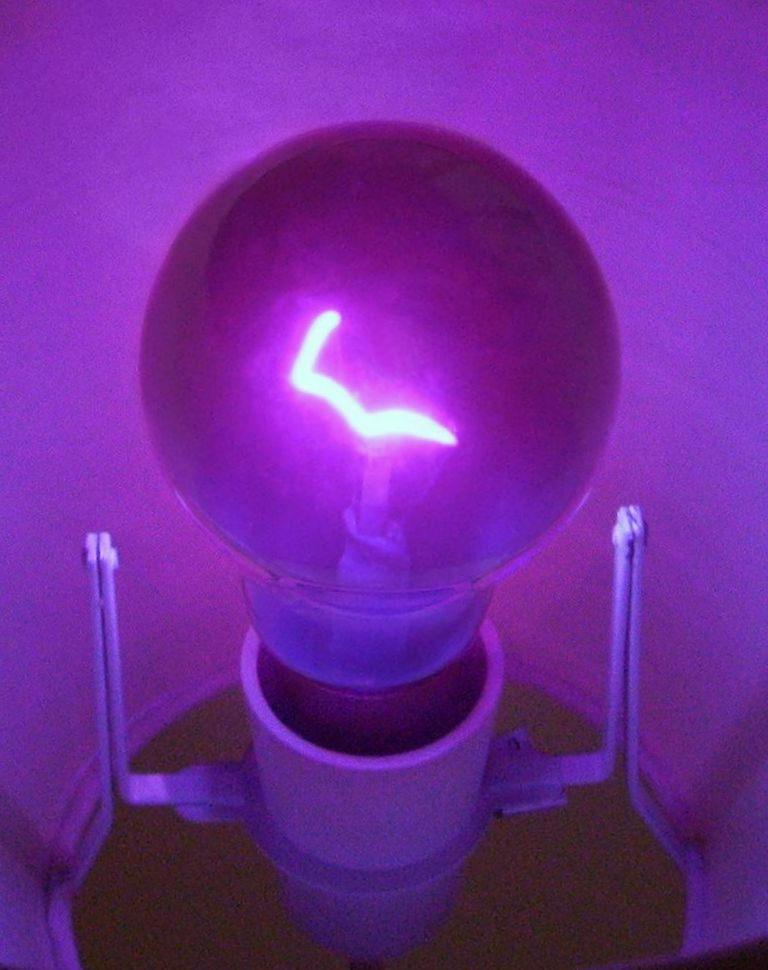
100-watt incandescent blacklight bulb

A blacklight may also be formed by simply using a UV filter coating such as Wood's glass on the envelope of a common incandescent bulb. This was the method that was used to create the very first blacklight sources. Although incandescent bulbs are a cheaper alternative to fluorescent tubes, they are exceptionally inefficient at producing UV light since most of the light emitted by the filament is visible light which must be blocked. Due to its black body spectrum, an incandescent light radiates less than 0.1% of its energy as UV light. Incandescent UV bulbs, due to the necessary absorption of the visible light, become very hot during use. This heat is, in fact, encouraged in such bulbs, since a hotter filament increases the proportion of UVA in the black-body radiation emitted. This high running-temperature reduces the life of the lamp from a typical 1,000 hours to around 100 hours.

=== Mercury vapor ===
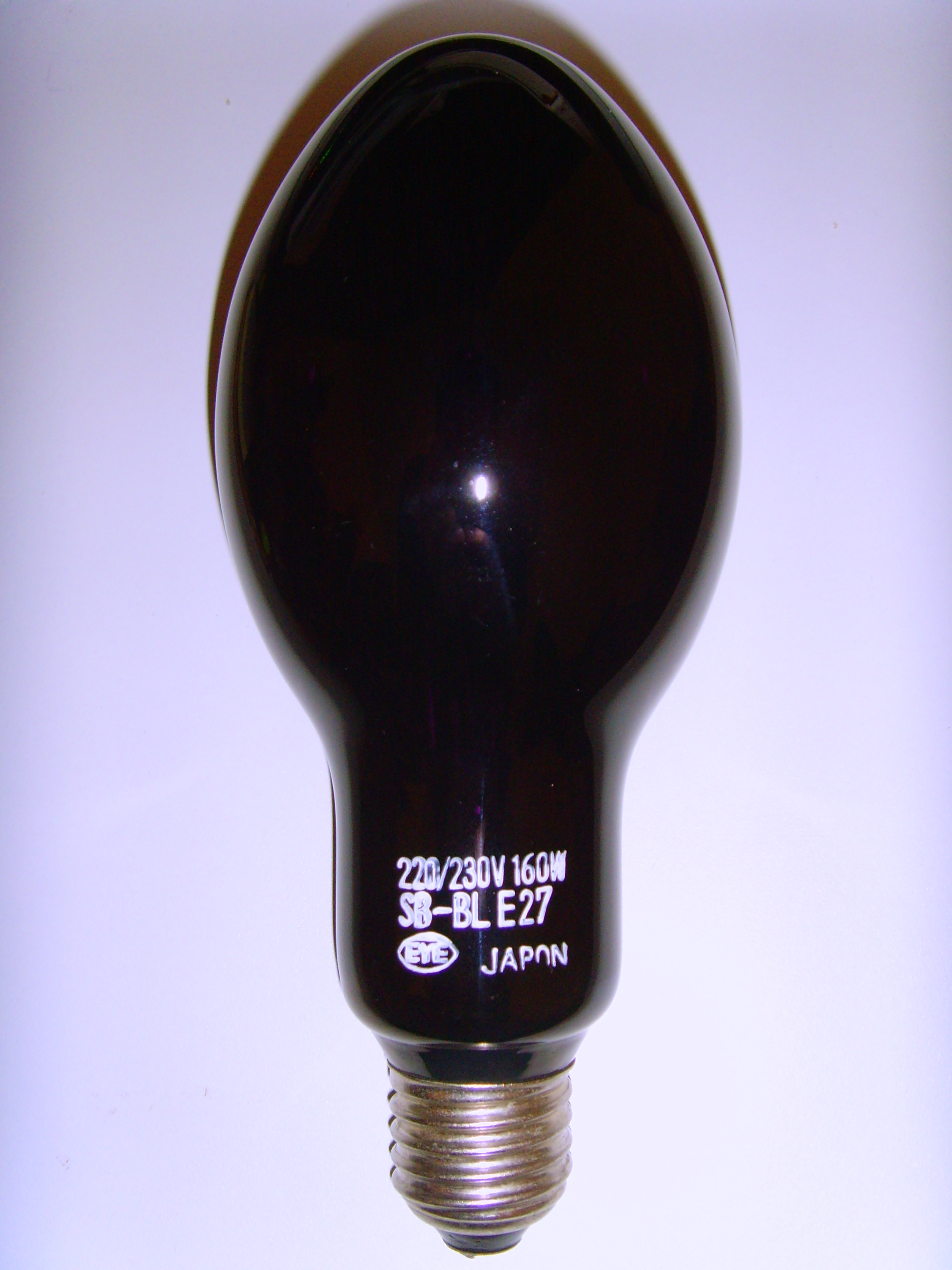
A 160-watt mercury vapor blacklight

High-power mercury vapor blacklight lamps are made in power ratings of 100 to 1,000 watts. These do not use phosphors, but rely on the intensified and slightly broadened 350–375 nm spectral line of mercury from high pressure discharge at between 5 and 10 standard atmospheres (500 and 1,000 kPa), depending upon the specific type. These lamps use envelopes of Wood's glass or similar optical filter coatings to block out all the visible light and also the short wavelength (UVC) lines of mercury at 184.4 and 253.7 nm, which are harmful to the eyes and skin. A few other spectral lines, falling within the pass band of the Wood's glass between 300 and 400 nm, contribute to the output. These lamps are used mainly for theatrical purposes and concert displays. They are more efficient UVA producers per unit of power consumption than fluorescent tubes.

=== LED ===
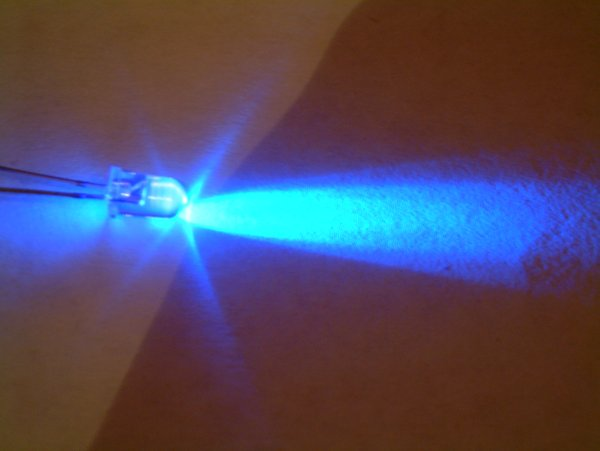
UV LED

Ultraviolet light can be generated by some light-emitting diodes, but wavelengths shorter than 380 nm were uncommon and the emission peaks were broad.

As of 2026, one LED manufacturer offers LEDs in wavelengths as short as 250 nm. Their blacklight LED peaks at 367.5 nm with a width of around 15 nm.

== Safety ==
Although blacklights produce light in the UV range, their spectrum is mostly confined to the longwave UVA region, that is, UV radiation nearest in wavelength to visible light, with low frequency and therefore relatively low energy. While low, there is still some power of a conventional blacklight in the UVB range. UVA is the safest of the three spectra of UV light. The relatively low energy of UVA light does not cause sunburn. It can damage collagen fibers, so may accelerate skin aging and cause wrinkles. It can also degrade vitamin A in the skin.

UVA light has been shown to cause DNA damage, but not directly, like UVB and UVC. Due to its longer wavelength, it is absorbed less and reaches deeper into skin layers, where it produces reactive chemical intermediates such as hydroxyl and oxygen radicals, which in turn can damage DNA and result in a risk of melanoma. The weak output of blacklights is not sufficient to cause DNA damage or cellular mutations in the way that direct summer sunlight can, although there are reports that overexposure to the type of UV radiation used for creating artificial suntans on sunbeds can cause DNA damage, photo-aging (damage to the skin from prolonged exposure to sunlight), toughening of the skin, suppression of the immune system, cataract formation and skin cancer.

UV-A can have negative effects on eyes in both the short-term and long-term.

== Uses ==
Ultraviolet radiation is invisible to the human eye, but illuminating certain materials with UV radiation causes the emission of visible light, causing these substances to glow with various colors. This is called fluorescence, and has many practical uses. Blacklights are required to observe fluorescence, since other types of ultraviolet lamps emit visible light which drowns out the dim fluorescent glow.

=== Medical applications ===
A Wood's lamp is a diagnostic tool used in dermatology by which ultraviolet light is shone (at a wavelength of approximately 365 nanometers) onto the skin of the patient; a technician then observes any subsequent fluorescence. For example, porphyrins—associated with some skin diseases—will fluoresce pink. Though the technique for producing a source of ultraviolet light was devised by Robert Williams Wood in 1903 using "Wood's glass", it was in 1925 that the technique was used in dermatology by Margarot and Deveze for the detection of fungal infection of hair. It has many uses, both in distinguishing fluorescent conditions from other conditions and in locating the precise boundaries of the condition.

=== Fungal and bacterial infections ===
It is also helpful in diagnosing:

- Fungal infections. Some forms of tinea, such as Trichophyton tonsurans, do not fluoresce.
- Bacterial infections
  - Corynebacterium minutissimum is coral red
  - Pseudomonas is yellow-green
- Cutibacterium acnes, a bacterium involved in acne causation, exhibits an orange glow under a Wood's lamp.

=== Ethylene glycol poisoning ===
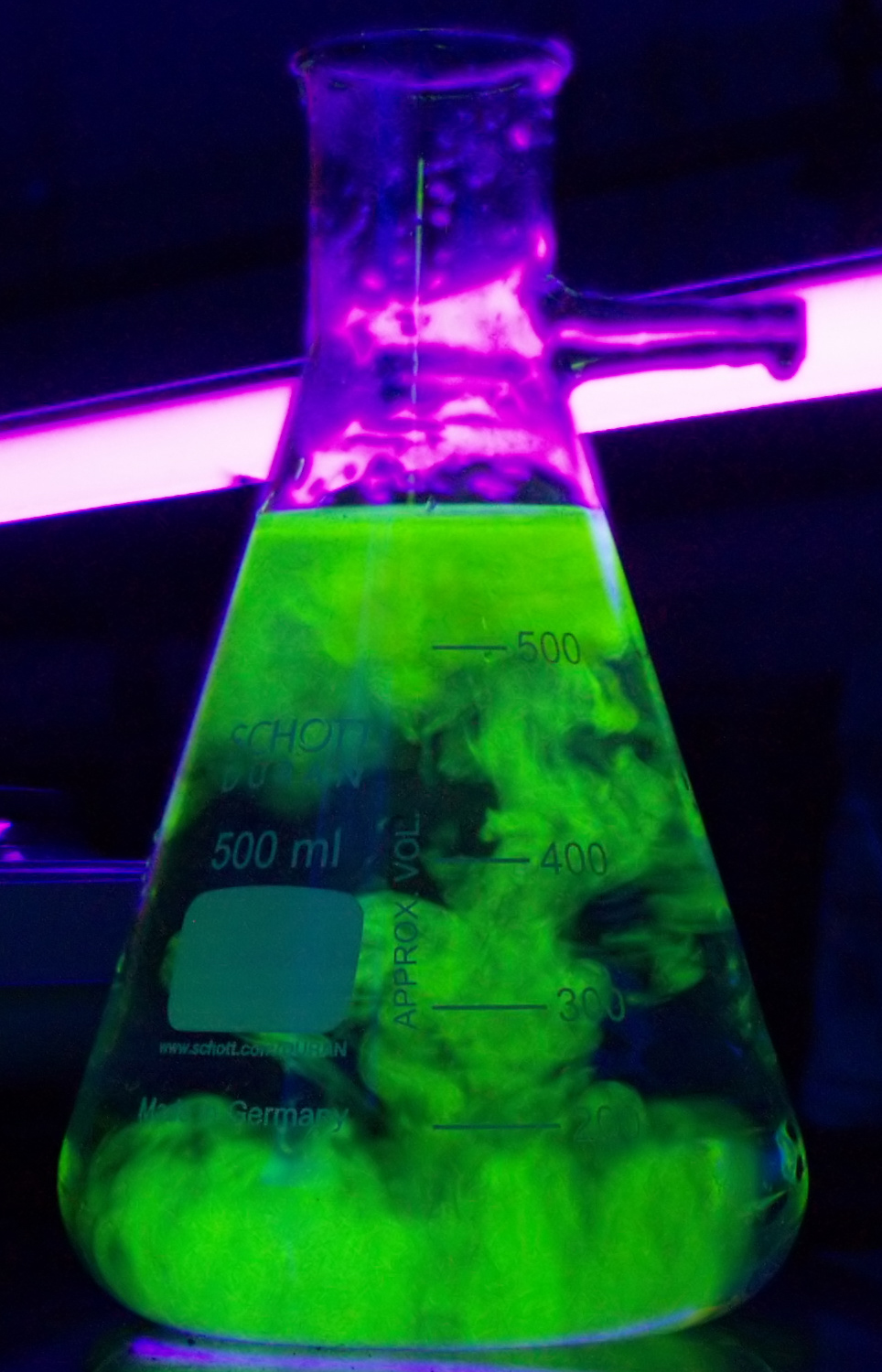
Fluorescein glowing under ultraviolet light

A Wood's lamp may be used to rapidly assess whether an individual is suffering from ethylene glycol poisoning as a consequence of antifreeze ingestion. Manufacturers of ethylene glycol-containing antifreezes commonly add fluorescein, which causes the patient's urine to fluoresce under Wood's lamp.

=== Diagnosis ===
Wood's lamp is useful in diagnosing conditions such as tuberous sclerosis and erythrasma (caused by Corynebacterium minutissimum, see above). Additionally, detection of porphyria cutanea tarda can sometimes be made when urine turns pink upon illumination with Wood's lamp. Wood's lamps have also been used to differentiate hypopigmentation from depigmentation such as with vitiligo. A vitiligo patient's skin will appear yellow-green or blue under the Wood's lamp. Its use in detecting melanoma has been reported.

=== Security and authentication ===
Blacklight is commonly used to authenticate oil paintings, antiques and banknotes. It can also differentiate real currency from counterfeit notes because, in many countries, legal banknotes have fluorescent symbols on them that only show under a blacklight. In addition, the paper used for printing money does not contain any of the brightening agents which cause commercially available papers to fluoresce under blacklight. Both of these features make illegal notes easier to detect and more difficult to successfully counterfeit. The same security features can be applied to identification cards such as passports or driver's licenses.

Other security applications include the use of pens containing a fluorescent ink, generally with a soft tip, that can be used to "invisibly" mark items. If the objects that are so marked are subsequently stolen, a blacklight can be used to search for these security markings. At some amusement parks, nightclubs and at other, day-long (or night-long) events, a fluorescent mark is rubber stamped onto the wrist of a guest who can then exercise the option of leaving and being able to return again without paying another admission fee.

=== Biology ===
Fluorescent materials are also very widely used in numerous applications in molecular biology, often as "tags" which bind themselves to a substance of interest (for example, DNA), so allowing their visualization.

Thousands of moth and insect collectors all over the world use various types of blacklights to attract moth and insect specimens for photography and collecting. It is one of the preferred light sources for attracting insects and moths at night. They can illuminate animal excreta, such as urine and vomit, that is not always visible to the naked eye.

=== Fault detection ===
Blacklight is used extensively in non-destructive testing. Fluorescing fluids are applied to metal structures and illuminated, allowing easy detection of cracks and other weaknesses.

If a leak is suspected in a refrigerator or an air conditioning system, a UV tracer dye can be injected into the system along with the compressor lubricant oil and refrigerant mixture. The system is then run in order to circulate the dye across the piping and components and then the system is examined with a blacklight lamp. Any evidence of fluorescent dye then pinpoints the leaking part which needs replacement.

=== Art and decor ===
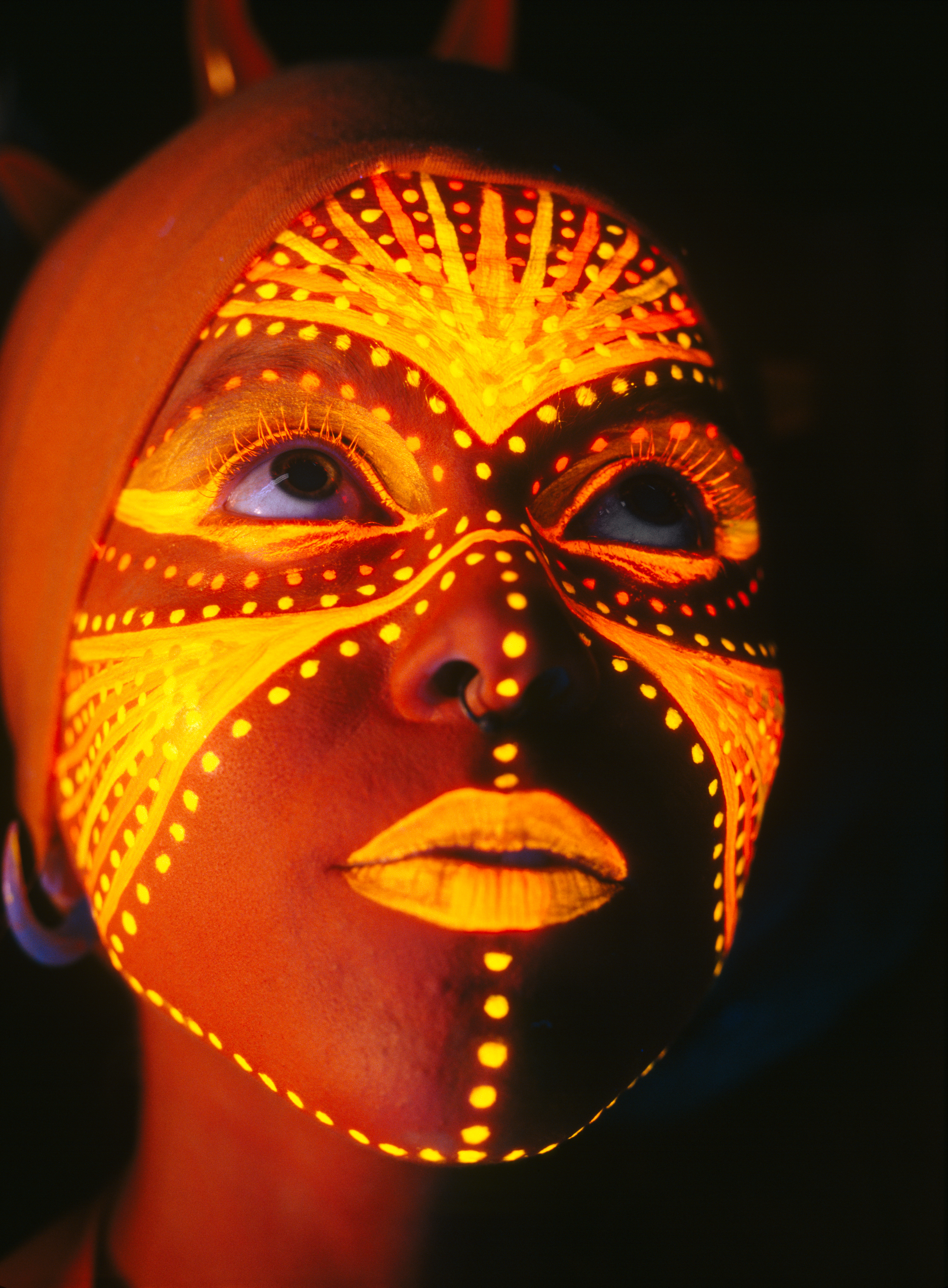
Fluorescent body paint. Paints and decorations that fluoresce under blacklight are used in theater and several art forms.

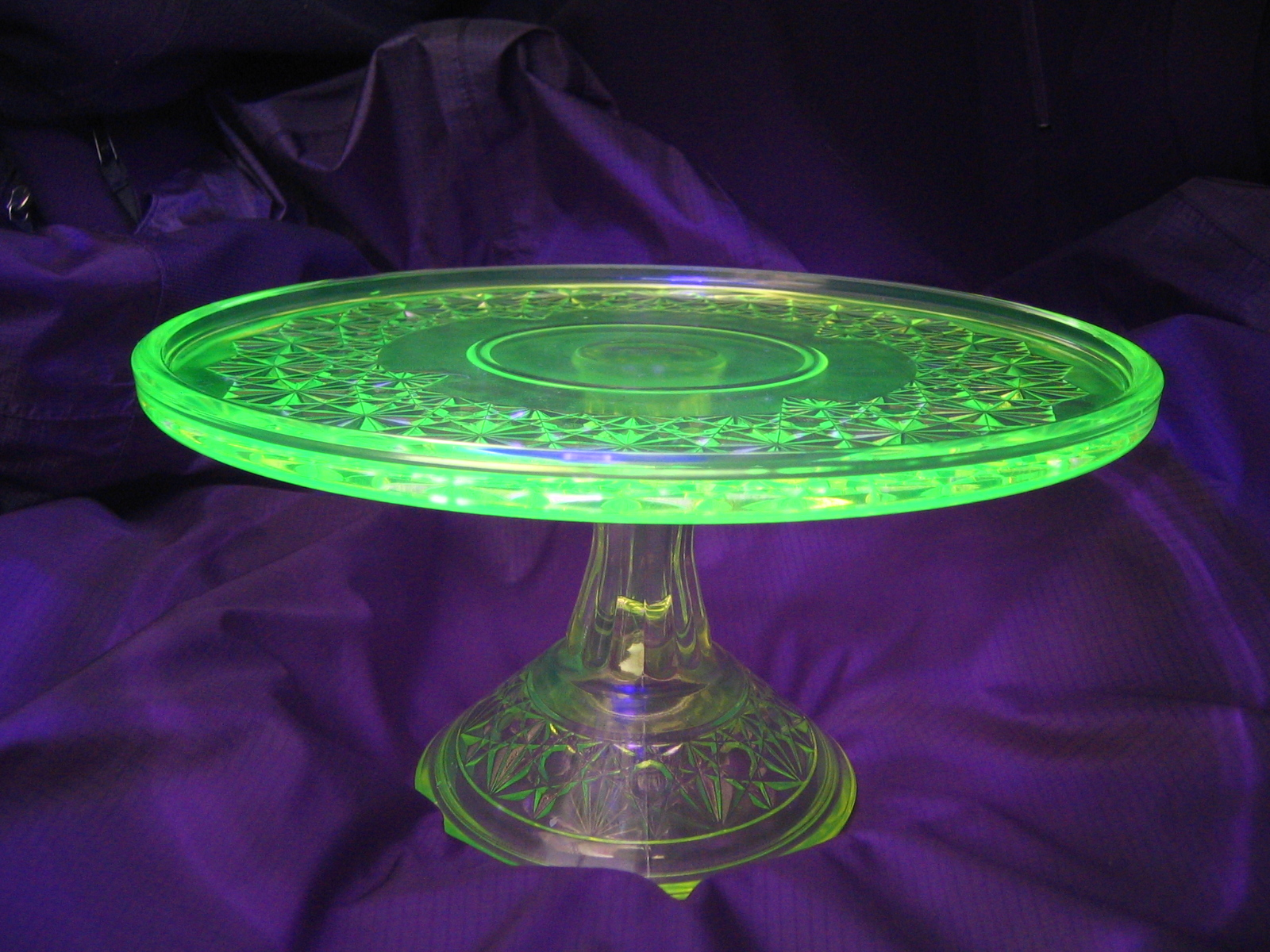
Uranium glass glows under UV light.

Blacklight is used to illuminate pictures painted with fluorescent colors, particularly on black velvet, which intensifies the illusion of self-illumination. The use of such materials, often in the form of tiles viewed in a sensory room under UV light, is common in the United Kingdom for the education of students with profound and multiple learning difficulties. Such fluorescence from certain textile fibers, especially those bearing optical brightener residues, can also be used for recreational effect, as seen, for example, in the opening credits of the James Bond film A View to a Kill. Blacklight puppetry is performed in a blacklight theater.

=== Mineral identification ===
Blacklights are a common tool for rock-hunting and identification of minerals by their fluorescence. The most common minerals and rocks that glow under UV light are fluorite, calcite, aragonite, opal, apatite, chalcedony, corundum (ruby and sapphire), scheelite, selenite, smithsonite, sphalerite, sodalite. The first person to observe fluorescence in minerals was George Stokes in 1852. He noted the ability of fluorite to produce a blue glow when illuminated with ultraviolet light and called this phenomenon "fluorescence" after the mineral fluorite. Lamps used to visualise seams of fluorite and other fluorescent minerals are commonly used in mines but they tend to be on an industrial scale. The lamps need to be short wavelength to be useful for this purpose and of scientific grade. UVP range of hand held UV lamps are ideal for this purpose and are used by Geologists to identify the best sources of fluorite in mines or potential new mines. Some transparent selenite crystals exhibit an "hourglass" pattern under UV light that is not visible in natural light. These crystals are also phosphorescent. Limestone, marble, and travertine can glow because of calcite presence. Granite, syenite, and granitic pegmatite rocks can also glow.

=== Curing resins ===
UV light can be used to harden particular glues, resins and inks by causing a photochemical reaction inside those substances. This process of hardening is called "curing". UV curing is adaptable to printing, coating, decorating, stereolithography, and in the assembly of a variety of products and materials. In comparison to other technologies, curing with UV energy may be considered a low-temperature process, a high-speed process, and is a solventless process, as cure occurs via direct polymerization rather than by evaporation. Originally introduced in the 1960s, this technology has streamlined and increased automation in many industries in the manufacturing sector. A primary advantage of curing with ultraviolet light is the speed at which a material can be processed. Speeding up the curing or drying step in a process can reduce flaws and errors by decreasing time that an ink or coating spends wet. This can increase the quality of a finished item, and potentially allow for greater consistency. Another benefit to decreasing manufacturing time is that less space needs to be devoted to storing items which can not be used until the drying step is finished. Because UV energy has unique interactions with many different materials, UV curing allows for the creation of products with characteristics not achievable via other means. This has led to UV curing becoming fundamental in many fields of manufacturing and technology, where changes in strength, hardness, durability, chemical resistance, and many other properties are required.

=== Cockpit lighting, LSD testing and tanning ===
One of the innovations for night and all-weather flying used by the US, UK, Japan and Germany during World War II was the use of UV interior lighting to illuminate the instrument panel, giving a safer alternative to the radium-painted instrument faces and pointers, and an intensity that could be varied easily and without visible illumination that would give away an aircraft's position. This went so far as to include the printing of charts that were marked in UV-fluorescent inks, and the provision of UV-visible pencils and slide rules such as the E6-B flight computer.

They may also be used to test for LSD, which fluoresces under blacklight while common substitutes such as 25I-NBOMe do not.

Strong sources of long-wave ultraviolet light are used in tanning beds.

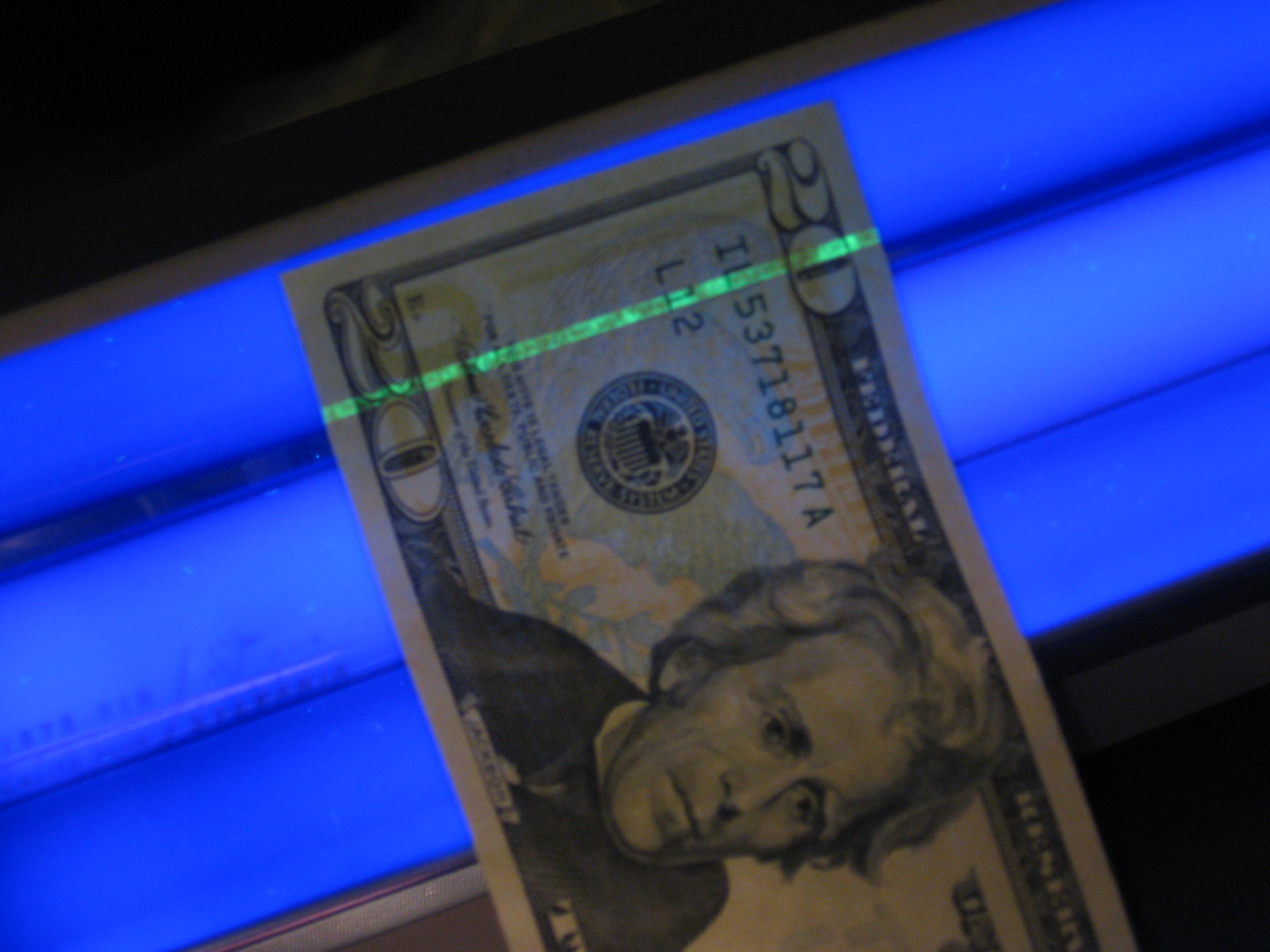
The security thread of a US $20 bill glows green under blacklight as a safeguard against counterfeiting.

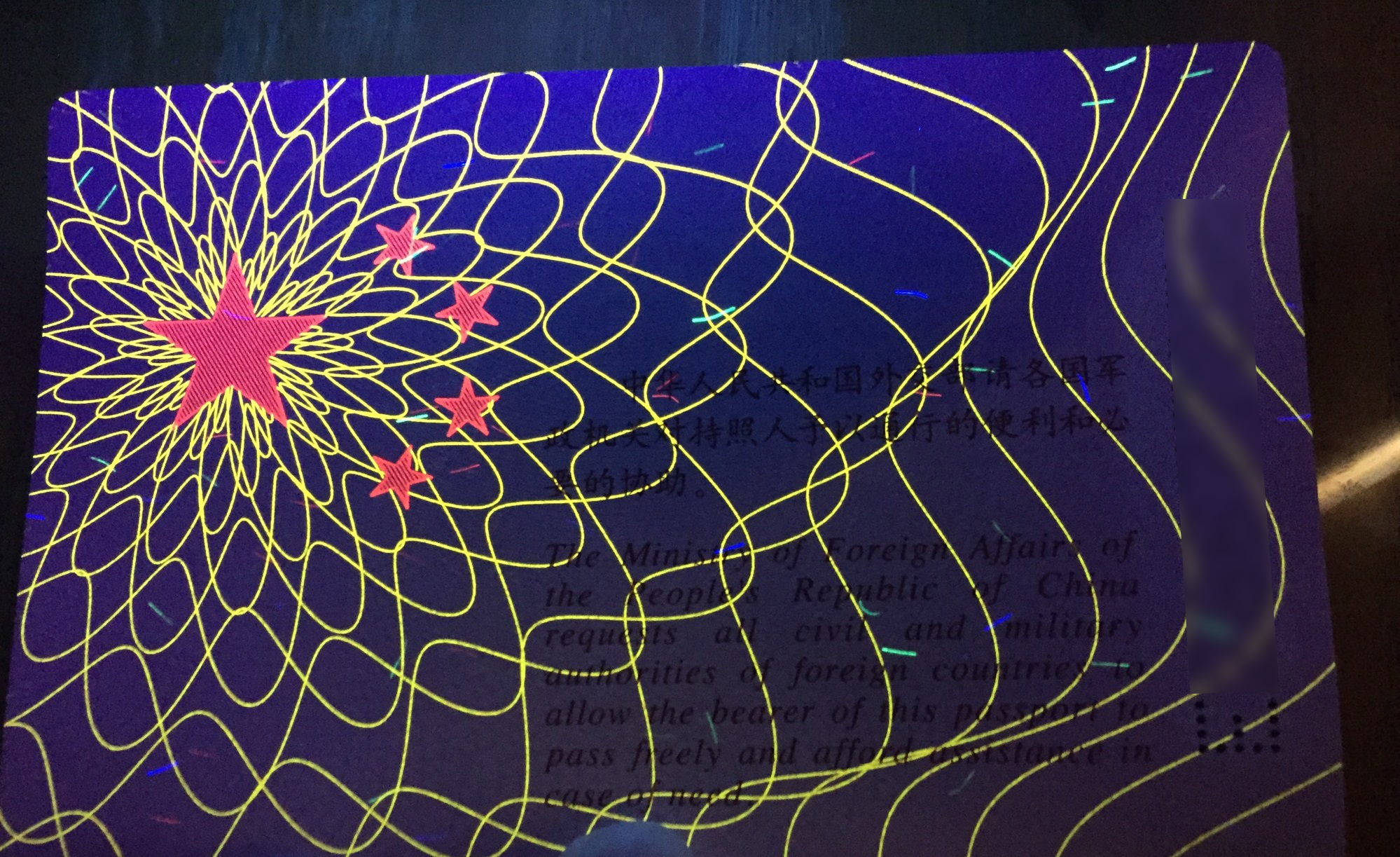
Anti-counterfeiting design of a Chinese passport glows under blacklight.

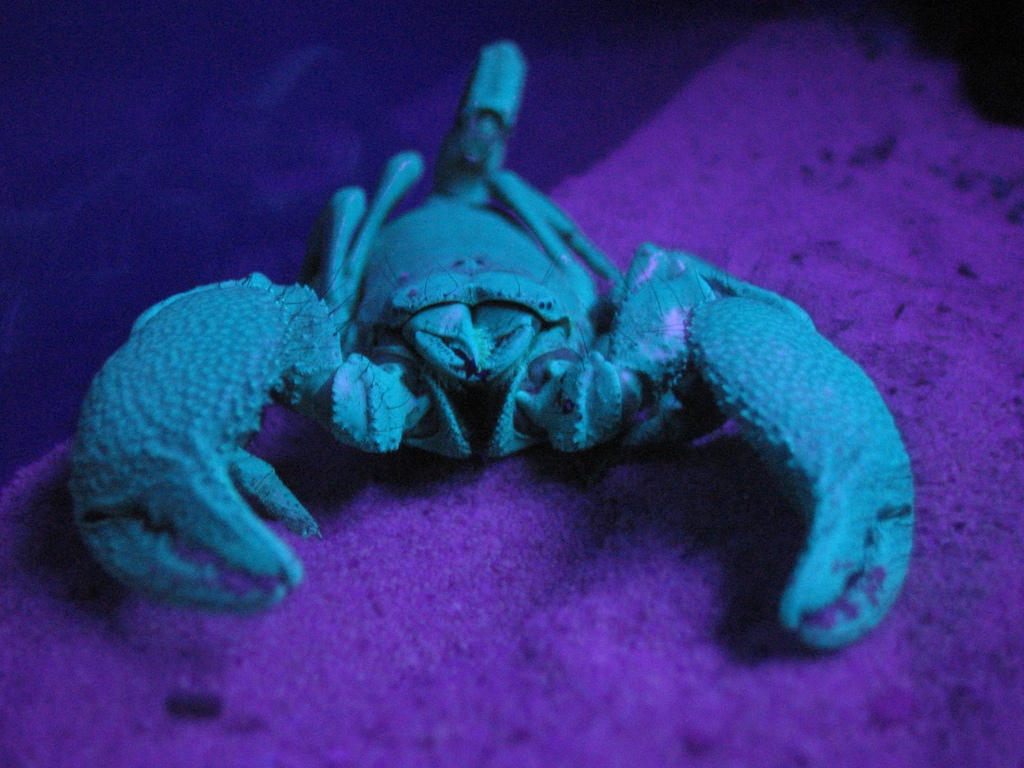
Scorpion fluorescing under ultraviolet from a blacklight

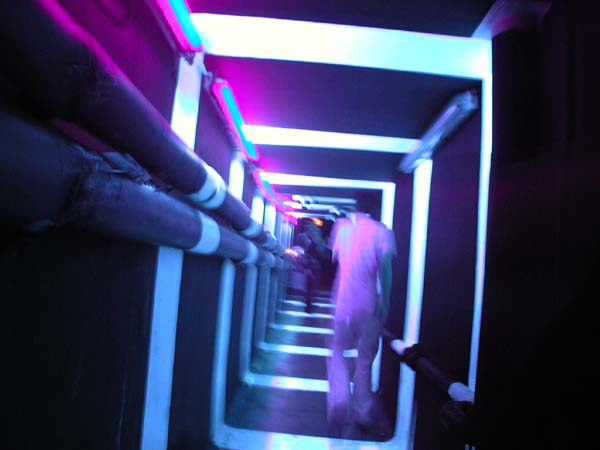
Decorative use of blacklight in a nightclub

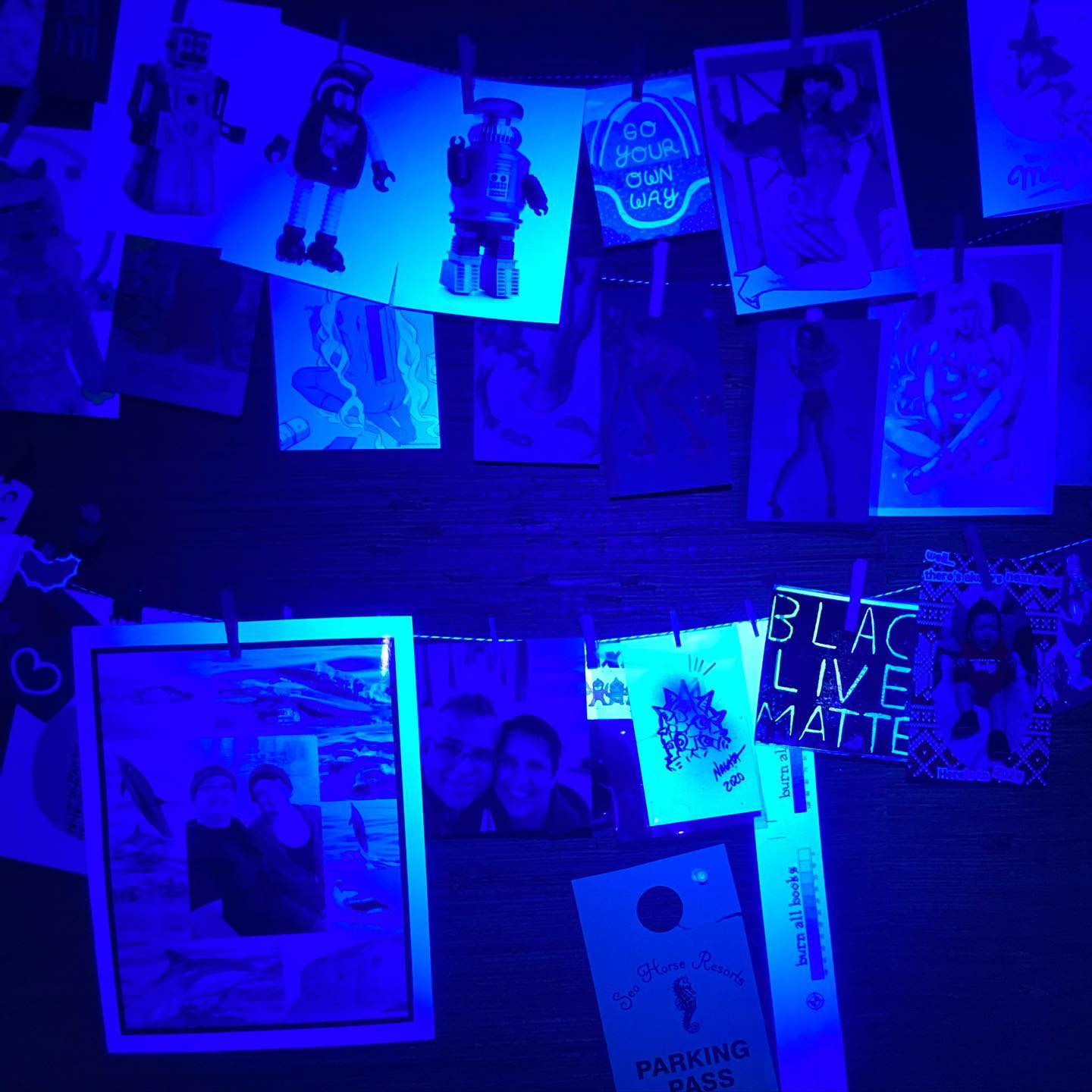
A common task in escape rooms is to find parts of an eye-safe blacklight torch to assemble to reveal messages in invisible ink

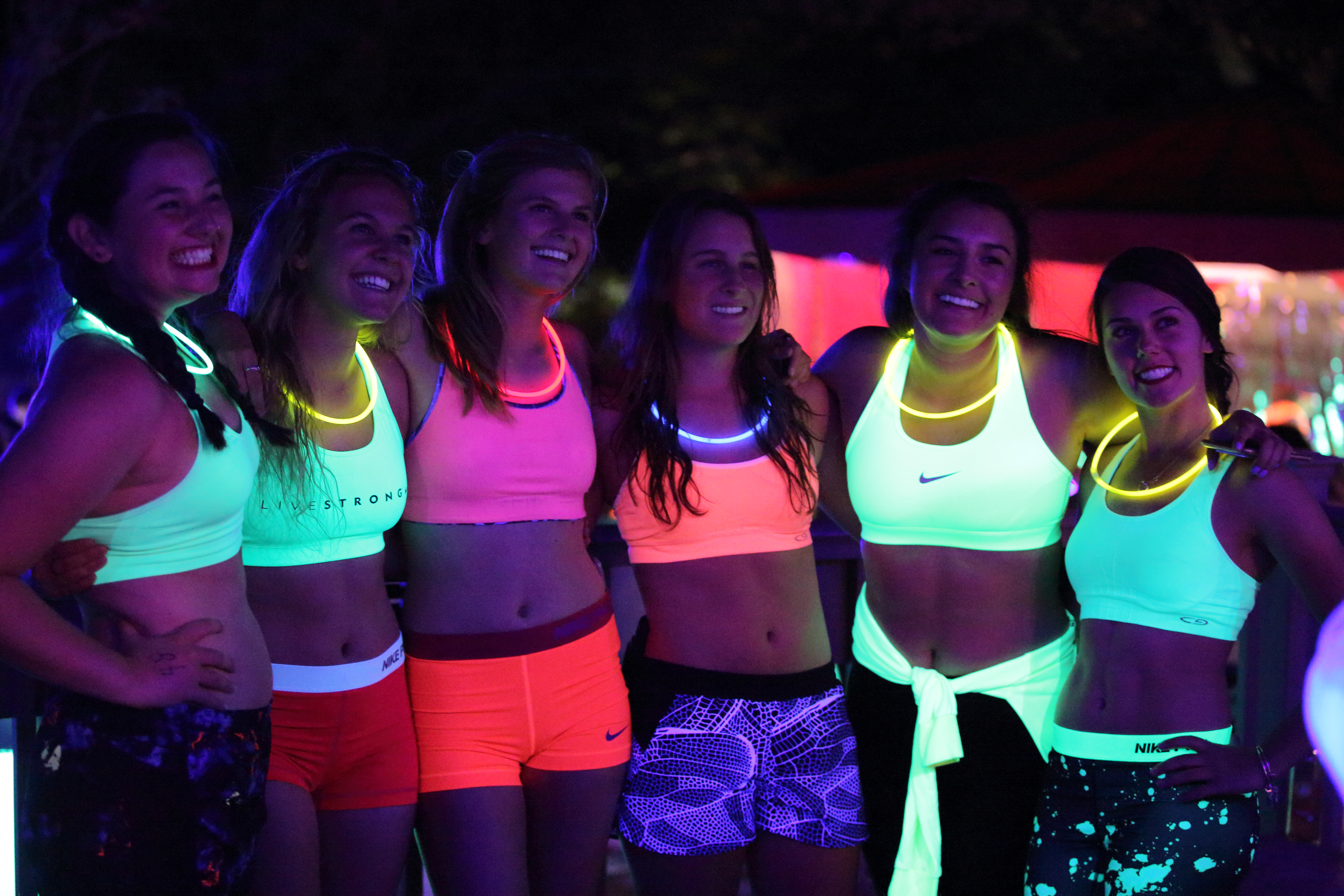
Blacklight used at a glow party on a university campus

== See also ==
- Blacklight poster
- List of light sources
