= Extraordinary optical transmission =

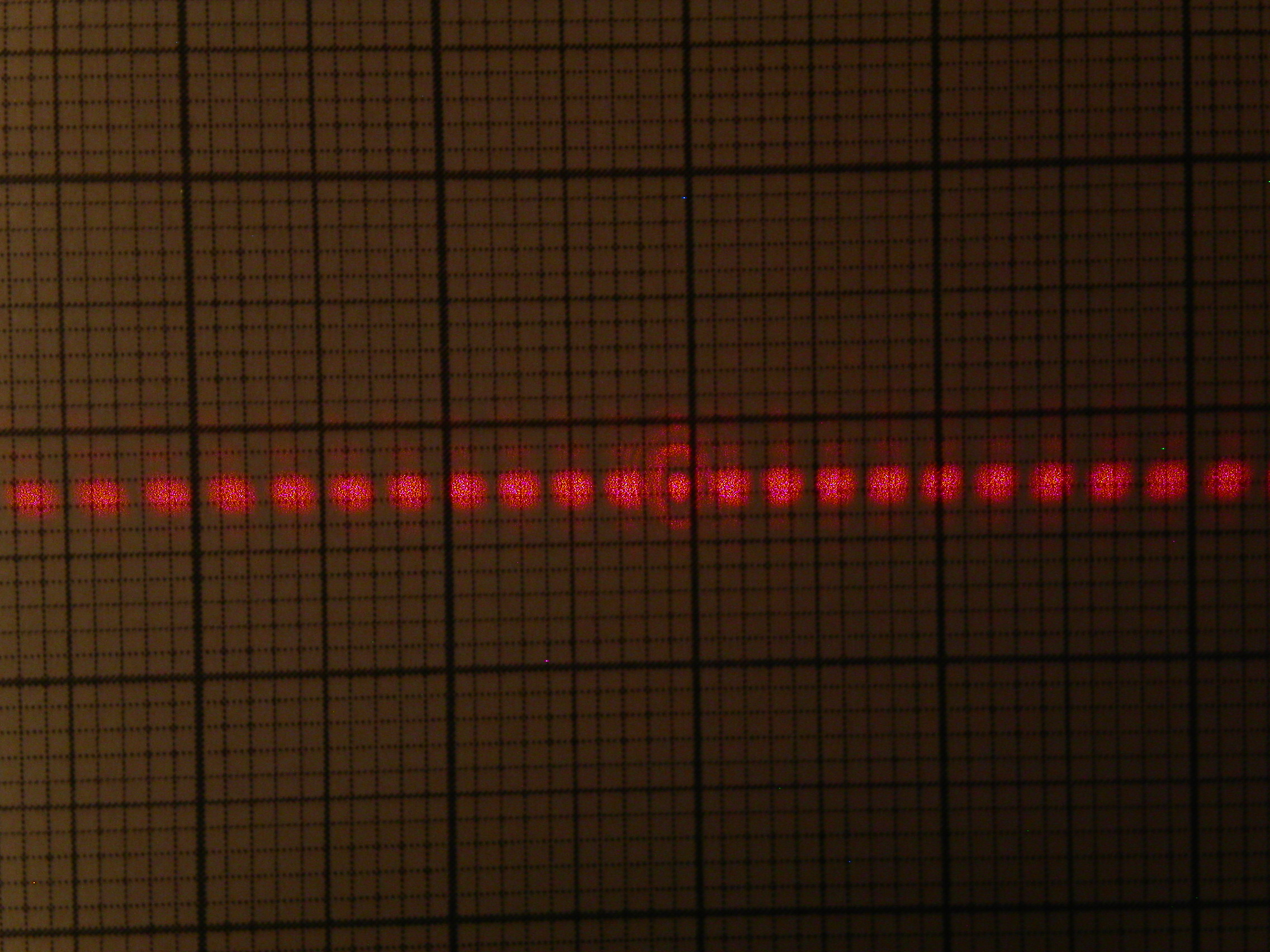
Interference pattern of double slits, where the slit width is one third the wavelength.

In optics, extraordinary optical transmission (EOT) is the phenomenon of greatly enhanced transmission of light through a subwavelength aperture in an otherwise opaque metallic film which has been patterned with a regularly repeating periodic structure. Generally when light of a certain wavelength falls on a subwavelength aperture, it is diffracted isotropically in all directions evenly, with minimal far-field transmission. This is the understanding from classical aperture theory as described by Hans Bethe. In EOT however, the regularly repeating structure enables much higher transmission efficiency to occur, up to several orders of magnitude greater than that predicted by classical aperture theory. It was first described in 1998.

== History ==
This phenomenon that was fully analyzed with a microscopic scattering model is partly attributed to the presence of surface plasmon resonances and constructive interference. A surface plasmon (SP) is a collective excitation of the electrons at the junction between a conductor and an insulator and is one of a series of interactions between light and a metal surface called plasmonics.

Currently, there is experimental evidence of EOT out of the optical range. Analytical approaches also predict EOT on perforated plates with a perfect conductor model. Holes can somewhat emulate plasmons at other regions of the electromagnetic spectrum where they do not exist. Then, the plasmonic contribution is a very particular peculiarity of the EOT resonance and should not be taken as the main contribution to the phenomenon. More recent work has shown a strong contribution from overlapping evanescent wave coupling, which explains why surface plasmon resonance enhances the EOT effect on both sides of a metallic film at optical frequencies, but accounts for the terahertz-range transmission.

Simple analytical explanations of this phenomenon have been elaborated, emphasizing the similarity between arrays of particles and arrays of holes, and establishing that the phenomenon is dominated by diffraction.

== Applications ==
EOT is expected to play an important role in the creation of components of efficient photonic integrated circuits (PICs). Photonic integrated circuits are analogous to electronic circuits but based upon photons instead of electrons.

One of the most ground-breaking results linked to EOT is the possibility to implement a Left-Handed Metamaterial (LHM) by simply stacking hole arrays.

EOT-based chemical and biological sensing (for example, improving ELISA based antibody detection) is another major area of research. Much like in a traditional surface plasmon resonance sensor, the EOT efficiency varies with the wavelength of the incident light, and the value of the in-plane wavevector component. This can be exploited as a means of transducing chemical binding events by measuring a change in the local dielectric constant (due to binding of the target species) as a shift in the spectral location and/or intensity of the EOT peak. Variation of the hole geometry alters the spectral location of the EOT peak such that the chemical binding events can be optically detected at a desired wavelength. EOT-based sensing offers one key advantage over a Kretschmann-style SPR chemical sensor, that of being an inherently nanometer-micrometer scale device; it is therefore particularly amenable to miniaturization.
