= Robert W. Wood =

American physicist and inventor (1868–1955)

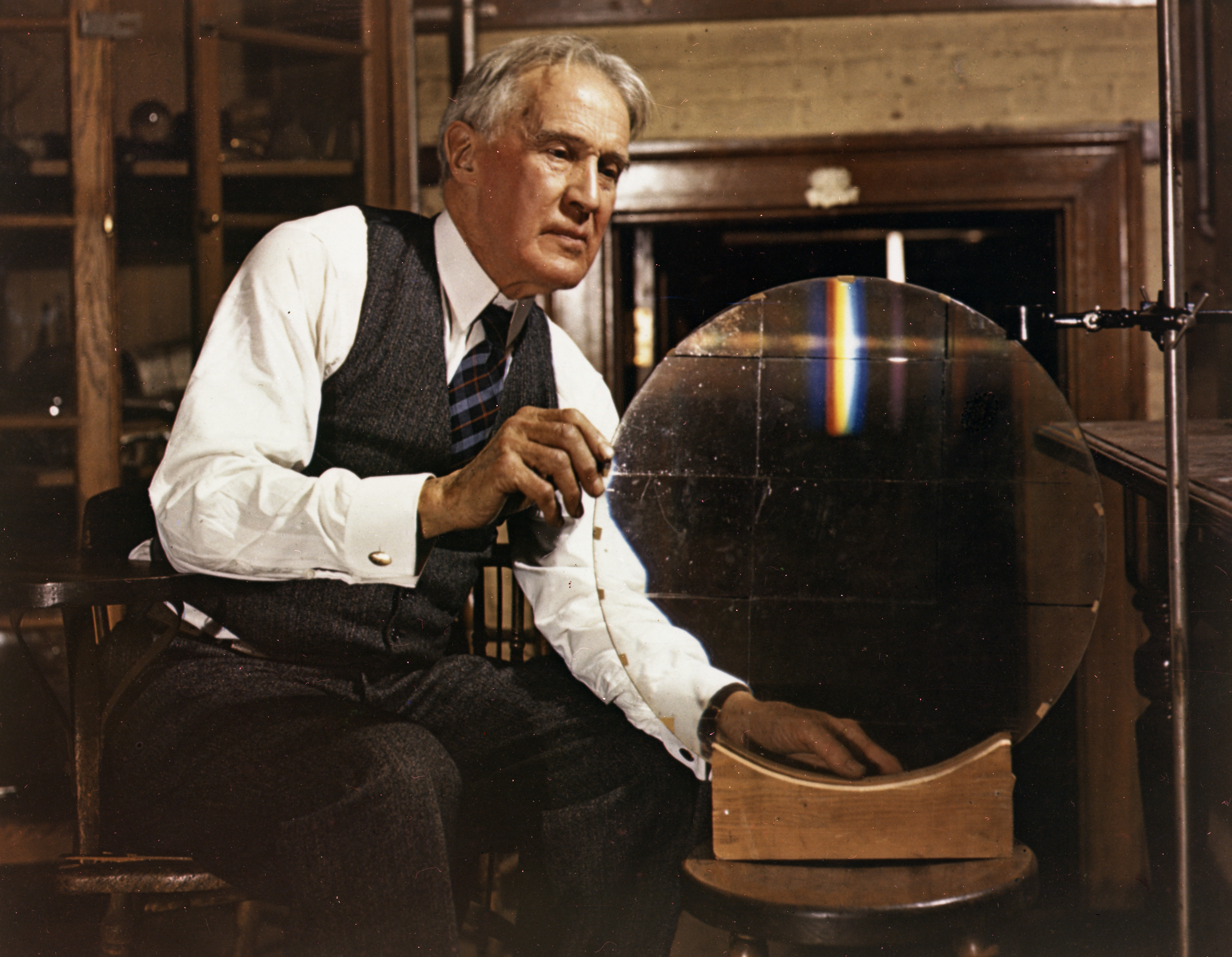
- Wood with his mosaic replica diffraction grating at Johns Hopkins University, c. 1938
- Born: Robert Williams Wood; May 2, 1868; Concord, Massachusetts, U.S.
- Died: August 11, 1955 (aged 87); Amityville, New York, U.S.
- Education: Roxbury Latin School
- Alma mater: Harvard University; Massachusetts Institute of Technology; University of Chicago
- Known for: Capillary wave; Fisheye lens; Gradient-index optics; Wood effect; Wood's anomaly; Wood's glass; Wood's lamp
- Awards: John Scott Medal (1908); Guthrie Lecture (1914); ForMemRS (1919); Matteucci Medal (1918); Frederic Ives Medal (1933); Rumford Medal (1938); Henry Draper Medal (1940)
- Scientific career
- Fields: Physics

Robert Williams Wood (May 2, 1868 – August 11, 1955) was an American physicist and inventor who made pivotal contributions to the field of optics. He pioneered infrared and ultraviolet photography. Wood's patents and theoretical work inform modern understanding of the physics of ultraviolet light, and made possible myriad uses of UV fluorescence, which became popular after World War I. He published many articles on spectroscopy, phosphorescence, diffraction, and ultraviolet light.

== Early life and education ==
Robert W. Wood was born in Concord, Massachusetts to Robert Williams Wood, Senior. His father had been born in Massachusetts in 1803 and worked as a physician in Maine until 1838, then as a physician and pioneer in the sugar industry on the Hawaiian Islands until 1866. He was also active in the American Statistical Association. Wood junior attended The Roxbury Latin School, initially intending to become a priest. However, he decided to study optics instead when he witnessed a rare glowing aurora one night and believed the effect to be caused by "invisible rays". In his pursuit to find these "invisible rays", Wood studied and earned several degrees in physics from Harvard University and the Massachusetts Institute of Technology.

As a student at Harvard he swallowed marijuana as part of a self-experiment, recorded the hallucinations he experienced in a report for a course of psychology. A New York newspaper published the report. After he had received a bachelor's degree in chemistry there, he continued at Johns Hopkins University and in 1892 he changed to the University of Chicago. In 1894 he went to the Berlin University to continue chemistry, and under Heinrich Rubens's influence changed permanently to a career in physics. In 1896, he returned to the US, first the Massachusetts Institute of Technology and in 1897 as an instructor at the University of Wisconsin.

== Career ==
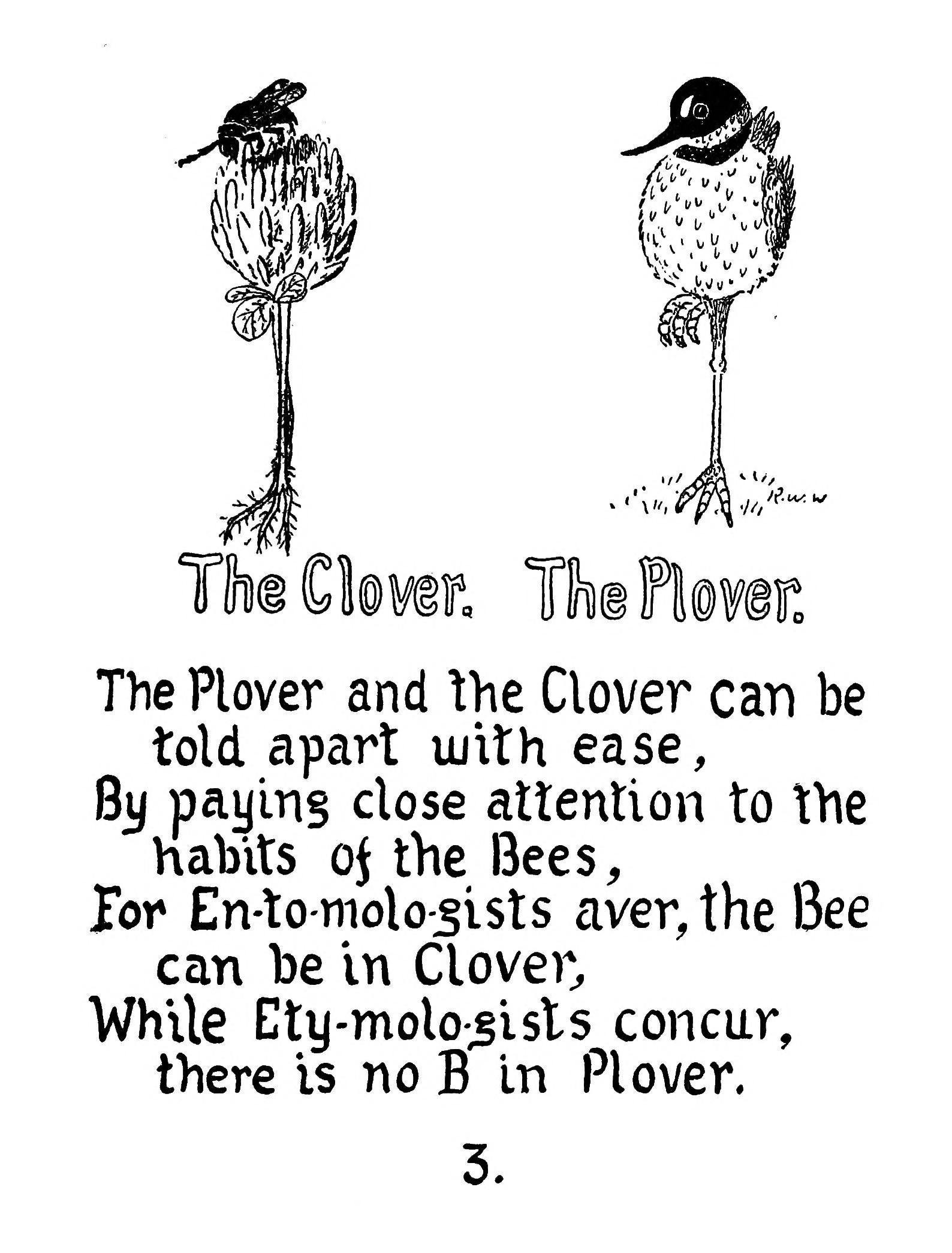
The Clover and the Plover, illustration and verse from How to Tell the Birds from the Flowers (1907). See nature fakers controversy.

After 4 years at the University of Wisconsin and after Henry Augustus Rowland's death, he was only 33 years old and yet appointed as his successor at Johns Hopkins University and full-time professor of "optical physics" at Johns Hopkins University from 1901 until his death. He worked closely with Alfred Lee Loomis at Tuxedo Park, New York.

In early 1900, he visited the United Kingdom giving a lecture at the Society of Arts in London on the diffraction process of photography in colours.

Early in 1902, Wood found that the reflection spectra of sub-wavelength metallic grating had dark areas. This unusual phenomenon was named Wood's anomaly and led to the discovery of the surface plasmon polariton (SPP), a particular electromagnetic wave excited at metal surfaces.

In 1903 he developed a filter, Wood's glass, that was opaque to visible light but transparent to both ultraviolet and infrared, and is used in modern-day black lights. He used it for ultraviolet photography but also suggested its use for secret communication. He was also the first person to photograph ultraviolet fluorescence. He also developed an ultraviolet lamp, which is widely known as the Wood's lamp in medicine. The slightly surreal glowing appearance of foliage in infrared photographs is called the Wood effect.

In 1904, Wood disproved the existence of so-called N-rays. The French physicist Prosper-René Blondlot claimed to have discovered a new form of radiation similar to X-rays, which he named N-rays. Some physicists reported having successfully reproduced his experiments; others reported that they had failed to observe the phenomenon. Visiting Blondlot's laboratory at the behest of the journal Nature, Wood surreptitiously removed an essential prism from Blondlot's apparatus during a demonstration. The alleged effect was still reported, showing that N-rays had been self-deception on Blondlot's part.

Wood identified an area of very low ultraviolet albedo (an area where most of the ultraviolet was absorbed) in the Aristarchus plateau region of the Moon, which he suggested was due to high sulfur content. The area continues to be called Wood's Spot.

In 1909, Wood constructed the first practical liquid-mirror astronomical telescope, by spinning mercury to form a paraboloidal shape, and investigated its benefits and limitations. Wood has been described as the "father of both infrared and ultraviolet photography". Though the discovery of electromagnetic radiation beyond the visible spectrum and the development of photographic emulsions capable of recording them predate Wood, he was the first to intentionally produce photographs with both infrared and ultraviolet radiation. In 1938, he officially retired and was then appointed research professor, a position he kept until his death.

Both before and after his retirement Wood took part in several police investigations, including the Wall Street bombing. His investigations into the "Candy-Box Murder", a 1930 bombing that killed 18-year-old Naomi Hall Brady and two of her siblings at her home in Seat Pleasant, Maryland, helped convict her brother-in-law Leroy of manslaughter. The bizarre death of 51-year-old socialite Katherine Briscoe at her Baltimore home in 1934 from a carelessly discarded blasting cap and his experiments derived therefrom would lead to the first scientific publication on explosively formed penetrators in the Proceedings of the Royal Society in 1936.

Wood also authored nontechnical works. In 1915, Wood co-wrote a science fiction novel, The Man Who Rocked the Earth, along with Arthur Train. Its sequel, The Moon Maker, was published the next year. Wood also wrote and illustrated two books of children's verse, How to Tell the Birds from the Flowers (1907), and Animal Analogues (1908).

== Personal life ==
In 1892, Wood married Gertrude Hooper Ames in San Francisco. She was the daughter of Pelham Warren and Augusta Hooper (Wood) Ames, and the granddaughter of William Northey Hooper and the Massachusetts Supreme Court justice Seth Ames. She was his "constant companion for more than 60 years, although she herself had no interest in scientific things", in Baltimore, at their summer place near Easthampton on Long Island, and during their travels abroad. They had a very wide circle of friends. His wife provided "stability without which a man of Wood's temperament might have found life occasionally very difficult". They had three children.

Having had a heart attack a few years before, he died during his sleep without any severe illness in Amityville, New York on August 11, 1955.

== Contributions to ultrasound ==
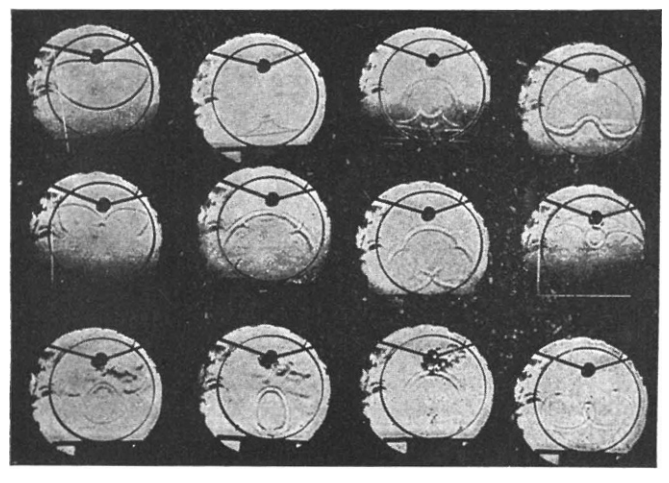
Photographs of sound waves (generated by sparks) and their reflections

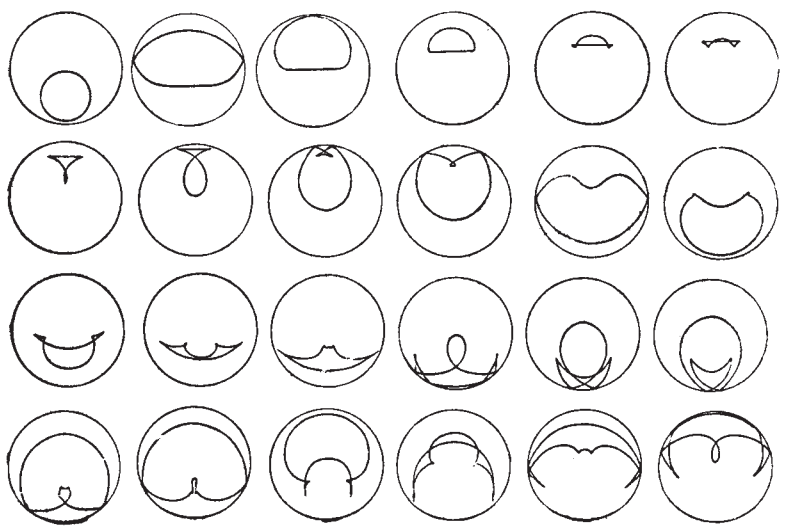
Sketches of wavefronts observed from photographs

Although physical optics and spectroscopy were Wood's main areas of study, he made substantial contributions to the field of ultrasound as well. His main contributions were photographing sound waves and investigating high-power ultrasonics.

=== Photography of sound waves ===
His first contribution to the field of ultrasonics was the photography of sound waves. Wood's primary research area was physical optics, but he found himself confronted with the problem of demonstrating to his students the wave nature of light without resorting to mathematical abstractions which they found confusing. He therefore resolved to photograph the sound waves given off by an electric spark as an analogy to light waves. An electric spark was used because it produces not a wave train, but a single wavefront, making it much more intuitive to study and visualize. Although this method was first discovered by August Toepler, Wood did more-detailed studies of the shock waves and their reflections.

=== High-powered ultrasound ===
After these early contributions Wood returned to physical optics, setting aside his interest in "supersonics" for quite some time. With the entry of the United States into World War I, Wood was asked to help with the war effort. He decided to work with Paul Langevin, who was investigating ultrasound as a method for detecting submarines. While in Langevin's lab, he observed that high-powered ultrasonic waves can cause the formation of air bubbles in water, and that fish would be killed or an experimenter's hand would suffer searing pain if placed in the path of an intense sound beam. All of these observations piqued his interest in high-powered ultrasound.

In 1926, Wood recounted Langevin's experiments to Alfred Lee Loomis, and the two of them collaborated on high intensity ultrasound experiments; this turned out to be Wood's primary contribution to the field of ultrasonics.

The experimental setup was driven by a two kW oscillator that had been designed for a furnace, allowing for the generation of very high output power. The frequencies they used ran from 100 to 700 kHz. When the quartz plate transducer was suspended in oil, it would raise a mound of oil up to 7 centimetres (3 in) higher than the rest of the surface of the oil. At lower powers, the mound was low and lumpy; at high powers, it would rise up to the full 7 cm, "its summit erupting oil drops like a miniature volcano". The airborne oil drops could reach heights of 30–40 centimetres (12–16 in). Similarly, when an 8-centimetre (3 in) diameter glass plate was placed on the surface of the oil, up to 150 grams (5 oz) of external weight could be placed on top of the glass plate, supported by the strength of the ultrasound waves alone. This was achieved by the waves reflecting and re-reflecting between the transducer and the glass plate, allowing each generated wave to impart its force to the glass plate multiple times.

When attempting to take the temperature of the mound of erupting oil with a glass thermometer, Wood and Loomis accidentally discovered another set of effects. They noted that although the mercury in the thermometer only indicated 25 °C (77 °F), the glass felt so hot that it was painful to touch, and they noticed that the pain became unbearable if they tried to squeeze the thermometer tightly. Even if very fine thread of glass only 0.2 millimetres (0.01 in) in diameter and 1 metre (3 ft 3 in) long was put in the oil at one end, holding a bulge in the glass at the other end still resulted in a groove being left in the skin and the skin being seared, with painful and bloody blisters forming that lasted several weeks, showing that the transmitted ultrasound vibrations generated were quite powerful. When a vibrating glass rod was placed lightly in contact with dried woodchips, the rod would burn the wood and cause it to smoke; when pressed against a woodchip it would quickly burn through the chip, leaving behind a charred hole. All the while the glass rod remained cool, with the heating confined to the tip. When a glass rod was pressed lightly against a glass plate it etched the surface, while if pressed harder it bored right through the plate. Microscopic examinations showed that the debris given off included finely powdered glass and globules of molten glass.

Wood and Loomis also investigated heating liquids and solids internally using high intensity ultrasound. While the heating of liquids was relatively straightforward, they were also able to heat an ice cube such that the center melted before the outside. The ability to heat or damage objects internally is now the basis of modern therapeutic ultrasound. Turning their attention to the effects of high-intensity ultrasound on living matter, Wood and Loomis observed ultrasound tearing fragile bodies to pieces. Cells were generally torn apart at sufficiently high exposure, although very small ones like bacteria managed to avoid destruction. Frogs, mice, or small fish were killed after one to two minutes of exposure, replicating Langevin's earlier observation.

Wood and Loomis also investigated the formation of emulsions and fogs, crystallization and nucleation, chemical reactions, interference patterns, and standing waves in solids and liquids under high-intensity ultrasound. After completing this broad array of experiments, Wood returned to optics and did not return to ultrasonic work. Loomis would go on to advance the science further with other collaborators.

== Honors ==
- Rumford Medal of the Royal Society, for his work in physical optics, 1938.
- Henry Draper Medal of the National Academy of Sciences, for his contributions to astrophysics, 1940.
- The crater Wood on the far side of the Moon is named after him.
- Honorary degrees from Berlin University, Clark University, University of Birmingham, and Edinburgh University.
- Member of the Royal Society, London ( (ForMemRS), London Optical Society (honorary), Konigliche Akademie der Wissenschaften zu Göttingen (corresponding), Accademia dei Lincei, Rome (foreign), Russian Academy of Science, Leningrad, American National Academy of Science, American Academy of Arts and Sciences, American Philosophical Society, Physical Society, Royal Institution, London (honorary), Physical Society of London (honorary fellow), Royal Swedish Academy, Stockholm (foreign), Indian Association for the Cultivation of Science, Calcutta (foreign).
- Medal awarded by the Royal Society of Arts for his diffraction process in color photography, 1899.
- Franklin Institute John Scott medal, awarded by the City of Philadelphia for further progress in diffraction color photos, 1907.
- J. Traill Taylor medal, awarded for photography by invisible rays, 1910.
- Gold medal, Societa' Italiana della Scienze, for general outstanding scientific achievement, 1918.
- Frederic Ives Medal, awarded by the Optical Society of America for distinguished work in physical optics, 1933.
- He served as the vice-president (1934) and president (1935) of the American Physical Society.
- In 1944, he was elected an Honorary Member of The Optical Society.

== Legacy ==
- The R. W. Wood Prize of the Optical Society of America recognizes an outstanding discovery, scientific or technological achievement or invention in the field of optics.

== Bibliography ==
=== Patents ===
- Flash-telescope
- Optical Method
- Optical Toy

=== Works by Wood ===
- Wood, R.W. (1891). "Effects of Pressure on Ice" (PDF). American Journal of Science. s3-41 (241): 30–33. doi:10.2475/ajs.s3-41.241.30. Archived from the original (PDF) on March 14, 2025.
- Wood, R.W. (1919). Researches in physical optics (vol.2), Resonance radiation and resonance spectra. New York: Columbia Univ. Press. ISBN 978-1-171-56302-0.
- Train, A.C. & Wood, R.W. (1916). The Moon Maker. Garden City: Doubleday, Page & Co. OCLC 2755800.
- Train, A.C. & Wood, R.W. (1915). The Man Who Rocked the Earth. Garden City: Doubleday, Page & Co. ISBN 978-0-405-06315-2.
- Wood, R.W. (1913). Researches in physical optics (vol. 1), with special reference to the radiation of electrons. New York: Columbia Univ. Press. ISBN 978-1-333-54006-7.
- Wood, R.W. (1909). "Note on the Theory of the Greenhouse". The London, Edinburgh, and Dublin Philosophical Magazine and Journal of Science. 17 (98): 319–320. doi:10.1080/14786440208636602 – via Taylor & Francis Online.
- Wood, R. W. (1917) [1907]. How to Tell the Birds from the Flowers and Other Wood-Cuts: A Revised Manual of Flornithology for Beginners (includes "Animal Anatomies"). New York: Dodd, Mead and Company. ISBN 978-0-353-03186-9.
- Wood, R.W. (1905). Physical Optics. New York: MacMillan. ISBN 978-1-172-70918-2.
