= Wood's glass =

Optical filter glass

Wood's glass is an optical filter glass invented in 1903 by American physicist Robert Williams Wood (1868–1955), which allows ultraviolet and infrared light to pass through, while blocking most visible light.

== History ==
Wood's glass was developed as a light filter used in communications during World War I. The glass filter worked both in infrared daylight communication and ultraviolet night communications by removing the visible components of a light beam, leaving only the "invisible radiation" as a signal beam. Wood's glass was commonly used to form the envelope for fluorescent and incandescent ultraviolet bulbs ("black lights"). In recent years, due to its disadvantages, other filter materials have largely replaced it.

== Composition ==
Wood's glass is special barium-sodium-silicate glass incorporating about 9% nickel oxide. It is a very deep violet-blue glass, opaque to all visible light rays except longest red and shortest violet. It is quite transparent in the violet/ultraviolet in a band between 320 and 400 nanometres with a peak at 365 nanometres, and a fairly broad range of infrared and the longest, least visible red wavelengths.

== Properties and uses ==
Wood's glass has lower mechanical strength and higher thermal expansion than commonly used glasses, making it more vulnerable to thermal shocks and mechanical damage.

The nickel and barium oxides are also chemically reactive, with tendency to slowly form a layer of hydroxides and carbonates in contact with atmospheric moisture and carbon dioxide.

Most contemporary "black-light" bulbs are made of structurally more suitable glass with only a layer of a UV-filtering enamel on its surface; such bulbs, however, pass much more visible light, appearing brighter to the eye. Due to manufacturing difficulties, Wood's glass is now more commonly used in standalone flat or dome-shaped filters, instead of being the material of the light bulb.

With prolonged exposure to ultraviolet radiation, Wood's glass undergoes solarization, gradually losing transparency for UV.

Photographic filters for ultraviolet photography, notably the Kodak Wratten 18A and 18B, are based on Wood's glass.

== Health effects ==
Bulbs made of Wood's glass are potentially hazardous in comparison with those made of enameled glass, since the reduced visible light output may cause observers to be exposed to unsafe levels of UV, because the source appears dim. The low output of black lights is not considered sufficient to cause DNA damage or cellular mutations, but excessive exposure to UV can cause temporary or permanent damage to the eye.

== See also ==
- Black light
- Dichroic filter
- Wood's lamp
