= Perfect conductor =

Idealized model for real conducting materials

In electrostatics, a perfect conductor is an idealized model for real conducting materials. The defining property of a perfect conductor is that static electric field and the charge density both vanish in its interior. If the conductor has excess charge, it accumulates as an infinitesimally thin layer of surface charge. An external electric field is screened from the interior of the material by rearrangement of the surface charge.

Alternatively, a perfect conductor is an idealized material exhibiting infinite electrical conductivity or, equivalently, zero resistivity (cf. perfect dielectric). While perfect electrical conductors do not exist in nature, the concept is a useful model when electrical resistance is negligible compared to other effects. One example is ideal magnetohydrodynamics, the study of perfectly conductive fluids. Another example is electrical circuit diagrams, which carry the implicit assumption that the wires connecting the components have no resistance. Yet another example is in computational electromagnetics, where perfect conductors can be simulated faster, since the parts of equations that take finite conductivity into account can be neglected.

== Properties of perfect conductors ==
Perfect conductors:

- have exactly zero electrical resistance – a steady current within a perfect conductor will flow without losing energy to resistance. Resistance is what causes heating in conductors; thus, a perfect conductor will generate no heat. Since energy is not being lost to heat, the current will not dissipate; it will flow indefinitely within the perfect conductor until there exists no potential difference.
- require a constant magnetic flux – the magnetic flux within the perfect conductor must be constant with time. Any external field applied to a perfect conductor will have no effect on its internal field configuration.

== Distinction between a perfect conductor and a superconductor ==
Superconductors, in addition to having no electrical resistance, exhibit quantum effects such as the Meissner effect and quantization of magnetic flux.

In perfect conductors, the interior magnetic field must remain fixed but can have a zero or nonzero value. In real superconductors, all magnetic flux is expelled during the phase transition to superconductivity (the Meissner effect), and the magnetic field is always zero within the bulk of the superconductor.

== See also ==
- Persistent current
