= 0-10 V lighting control =

Electronic DC voltage dimming system

0–10 V is one of the first and simplest electronic lighting control signaling systems, used as an early fluorescent dimming system. The control signal is a DC voltage that varies between zero and ten volts. Two standards are recognized: current sourcing and current sinking.

== Current Sourcing ==
Typically used in commercial and theatrical dimming, the controller sends a voltage signal to the device. The controlled lighting should scale its output so that at 10 V, the controlled light should be at 100% of its potential output, and at 0 V it should at 0% output (i.e., off). Dimming devices may be designed to respond in various patterns to the intermediate voltages, giving output curves that are linear for voltage output, actual light output, power output, or perceived light output.

Receivers have a nominal input impedance of 100±20 kΩ (i.e., maximum 1.0±0.2 mW at 10 V).

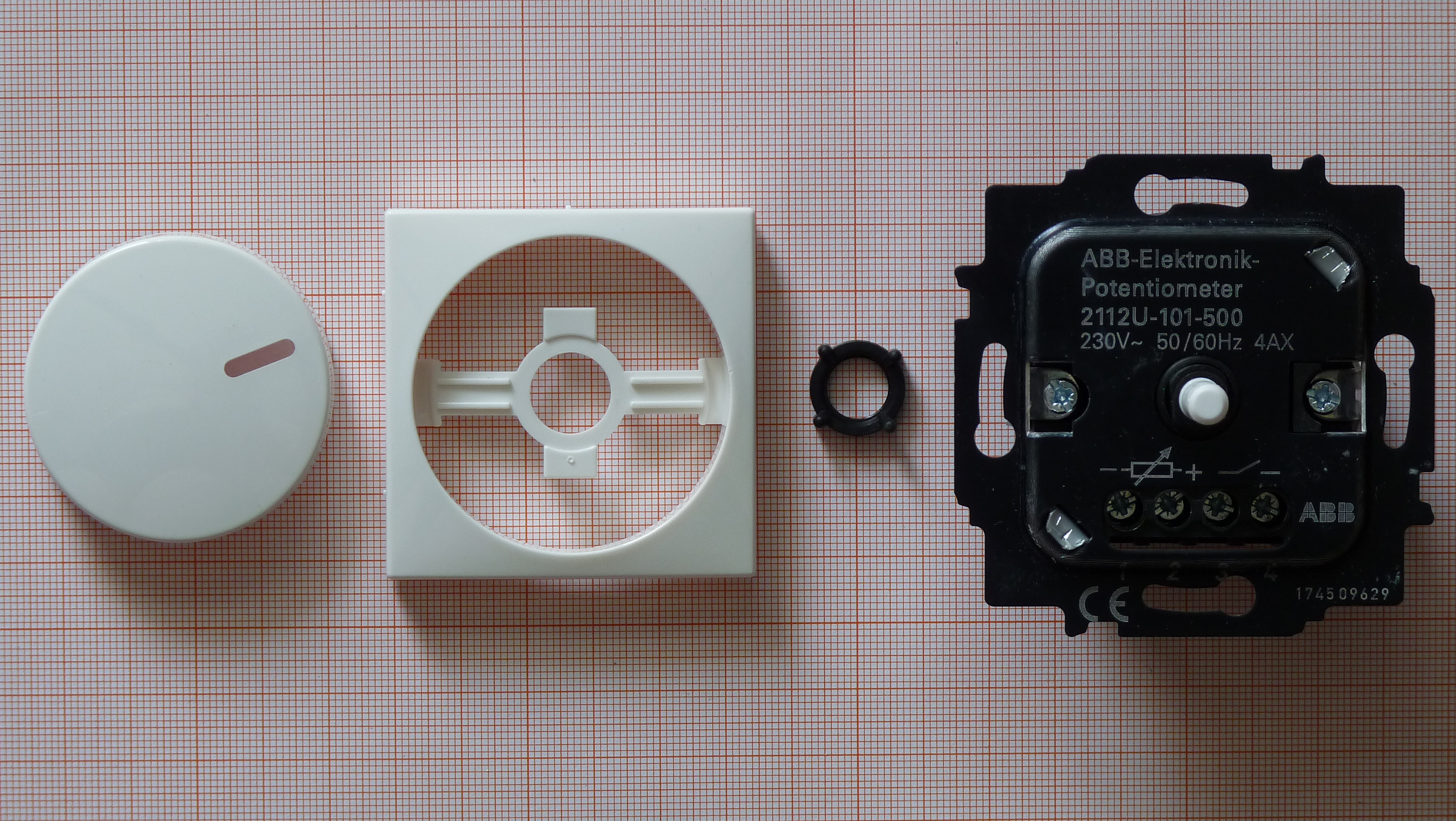
0-10V dimmer

In production lighting this system was replaced by analog multiplexed systems such as D54 and AMX192, which themselves have been almost completely replaced by DMX512. For dimmable fluorescent lamps (where it operates instead at 1–10 V, where 1 V is minimum and 0 V is off), the system is being replaced by DSI, which itself is in the process of being replaced by DALI. However, 0–10 V control again gained popularity in the 2010s. It is common in LED flat panel fixtures.

== Current Sinking ==
Typically used in architectural lighting, in a current sinking control scheme, the light fixture provides an electrical current source and the controller draws a variable amount of current from it, so as to vary the output voltage from the fixture. The fixture detects that voltage and dims accordingly. If the controllers draws no current, the fixture generates 10 volts, which causes it to generate its brightest light. If the controller draws maximum current, the fixture generates essentially no voltage, which causes it to generate its dimmest light.

This scheme is fail-safe for the controller. As the controller cannot draw current through a broken wire, should a control wire be cut, the fixture generates maximum brightness. Should the controller short-circuit the two control wires, it draws the maximum current allowed by the fixture and the fixture generates minimum brightness.

Usually, the fixture supplies the current source as a 10 V voltage source through a resistor. The controller works by connecting a variable resistor across the control wires from the fixture. The two resistors form a voltage divider to produce a control voltage Vc = Vs * (Rc / (Rc + Rs)) where Vc is the resulting voltage across the control wires, Vs is the source voltage inside the fixture, Rc is the variable resistance in the controller, and Rs is the source resistance inside the fixture. Vs may be greater than 10 V so that a maximum intended value of Rc produces a 10 V maximum control voltage. A zero value of Rc causes a 0 V control voltage.

As a practical matter, many 0-10 V dimming control inputs can be operated by replacing the variable control resistor with an electronic switch. When the switch is on, the control voltage is near 0 and the light is fully dim. When the switch is off, the control voltage is maximum and the light is fully bright. The switch is controlled by a PWM (Pulse Width Modulation) signal, which alternately turns the switch on and off at a rapid rate. The relative proportion of off time vs. on time determines brightness. For example, if the switch is off 10% of the time, the resulting control signal would be the equivalent of 1 V produced with a variable resistor. The PWM method does not require selection of accurate resistance values. It can be applied simultaneously to control signals of multiple lights by connecting their control inputs in parallel.

As of the early 2020's, a significant percentage of 0–10 V dimmable LED flat panels do not respond rapidly to control signal changes or even follow the average control signal value. A pulse width modulated control signal, as described above, does not work well with such fixtures.

Dimming fluorescent ballasts and dimming LED drivers often use 0–10 V control signals to control dimming functions. In many cases, the dimming range of the power supply or ballast is limited. If the light output can only be dimmed from 100% down to 10%, there must be a switch or relay available to kill power to the system and turn the light completely off. Some 0–10 V controllers offer a built-in line voltage relay, others require an external line voltage relay. Some 0-10 V controllers, usually called 0-10 V Blink'n'Dim adapters, create a 0-10 V control signal in response to short blink signals from the power switch. Depending on the application, these options should be considered.

== Advantages and disadvantages ==
The simplicity of the lighting system makes it straightforward to understand, implement and diagnose, and its low current (typically 1 mA) means it can be run along relatively thin cables with little voltage drop. However, since it requires one wire per control channel (plus a common return wire), a sophisticated system could have hundreds of wires, requiring expensive multicore cables and connectors. Over a long cable, the voltage drop requires every channel of the receiving device to be calibrated to compensate for the voltage losses. (This is only a theoretical limitation as the resistance of the thinnest practical wire is around 20 Ω/1000 m.) Capacitive coupling from nearby AC power cables can affect the signal to the fitting and even cause flickering. Signal wire running parallel to power cables for a fair distance would need to be screened. This is particularly difficult when control wires must be run inside closed and previously wired walls.

0–10 V lighting control is widely used in commercial and industrial lighting.

== See also ==
- Dimmer
- Lighting control console
- Lighting control system
- Phase-fired controller
