= Cove lighting =

Form of indirect lighting

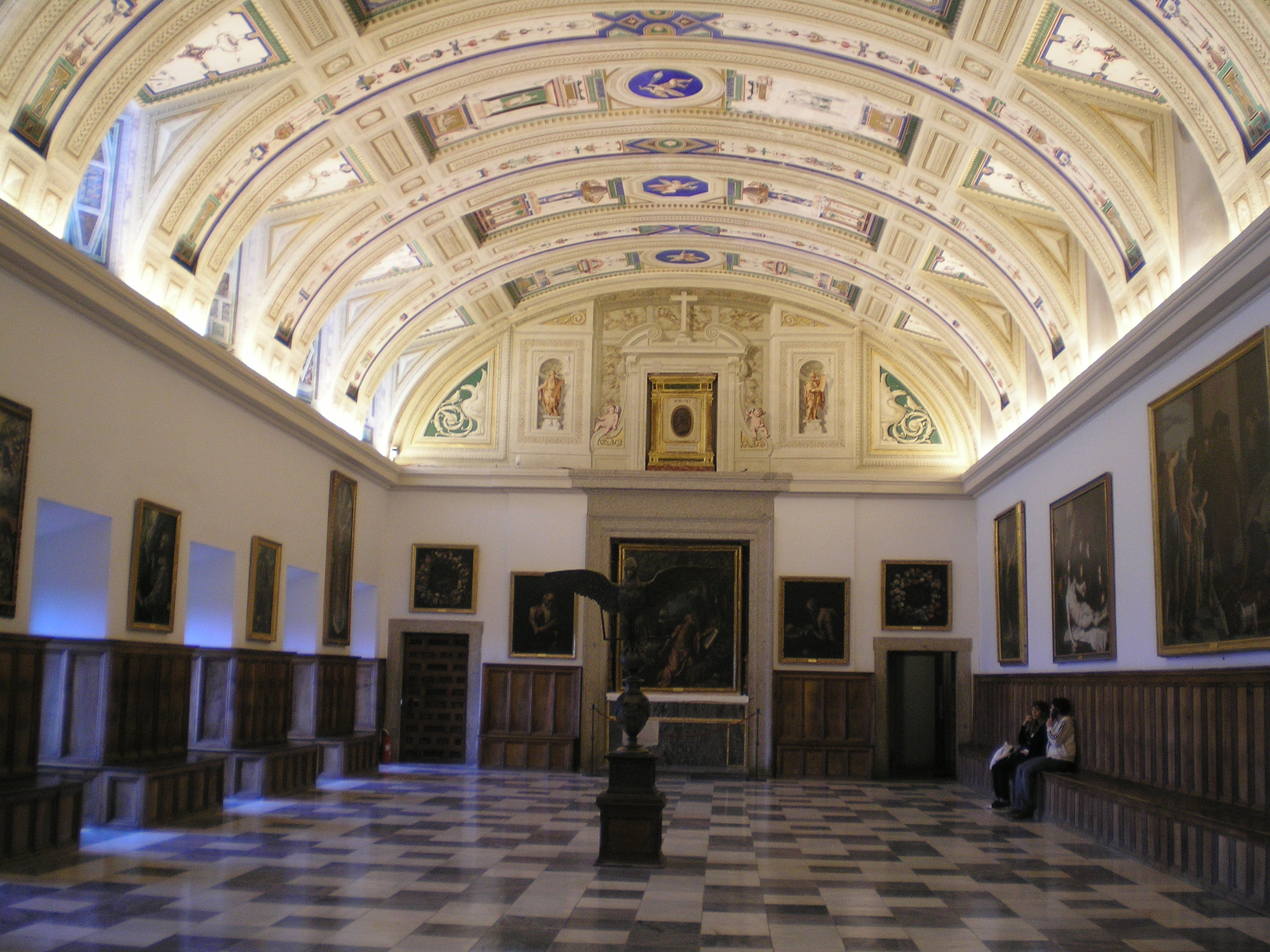
Cove lighting of the Sala Vicarial in the Monasterio del Escorial, San Lorenzo de El Escorial, Spain

Cove lighting is a form of indirect lighting built into ledges, recesses, or curtain valances in a ceiling or high on the walls of a room. It directs light up towards the ceiling and down adjacent walls. It may be used as primary lighting, or for aesthetic accent, especially to highlight decorative ceilings. Cove lighting is valued because it hides the fixtures, and because it provides a very even light.

== Installation ==
Cove lighting is usually installed with LED strips, which have energy-efficiency benefits. They are mounted on an aluminium profile for optimum heat dissipation, with prismatic covers. With a dimming controller (either analog 1..10V controls or digital, DALI based), the cove lighting can be dimmed. A wide range of LEDs are available, from warm white, daylight and even ones that can change colour.

Traditionally, cove lighting was installed by using T5 fluorescent tubes. T5 luminaires are an energy-efficient alternative to larger luminaires (such as T8 lamps) because they save on materials.

Lighting specialists recommend installing cove lighting at least 18 inches (46 cm) from the ceiling and 6 feet 8 inches (2.03 m) from the floor. In kitchens, cove lights can be installed on the top of kitchen cabinets. Luminaire strips should overlap the tubes to reduce the shadow effect at the lamp ends.

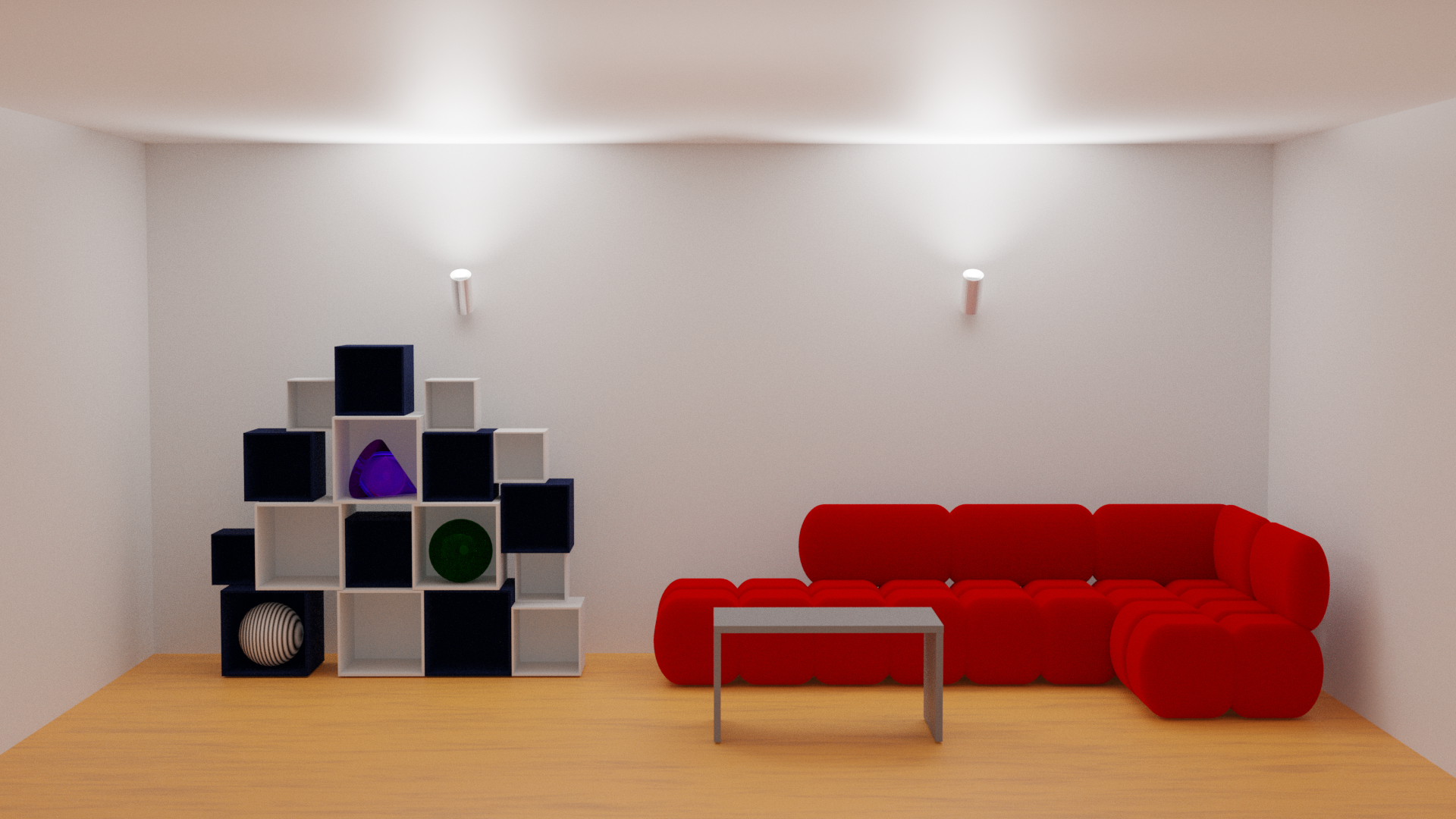
Light from the wall to the ceiling

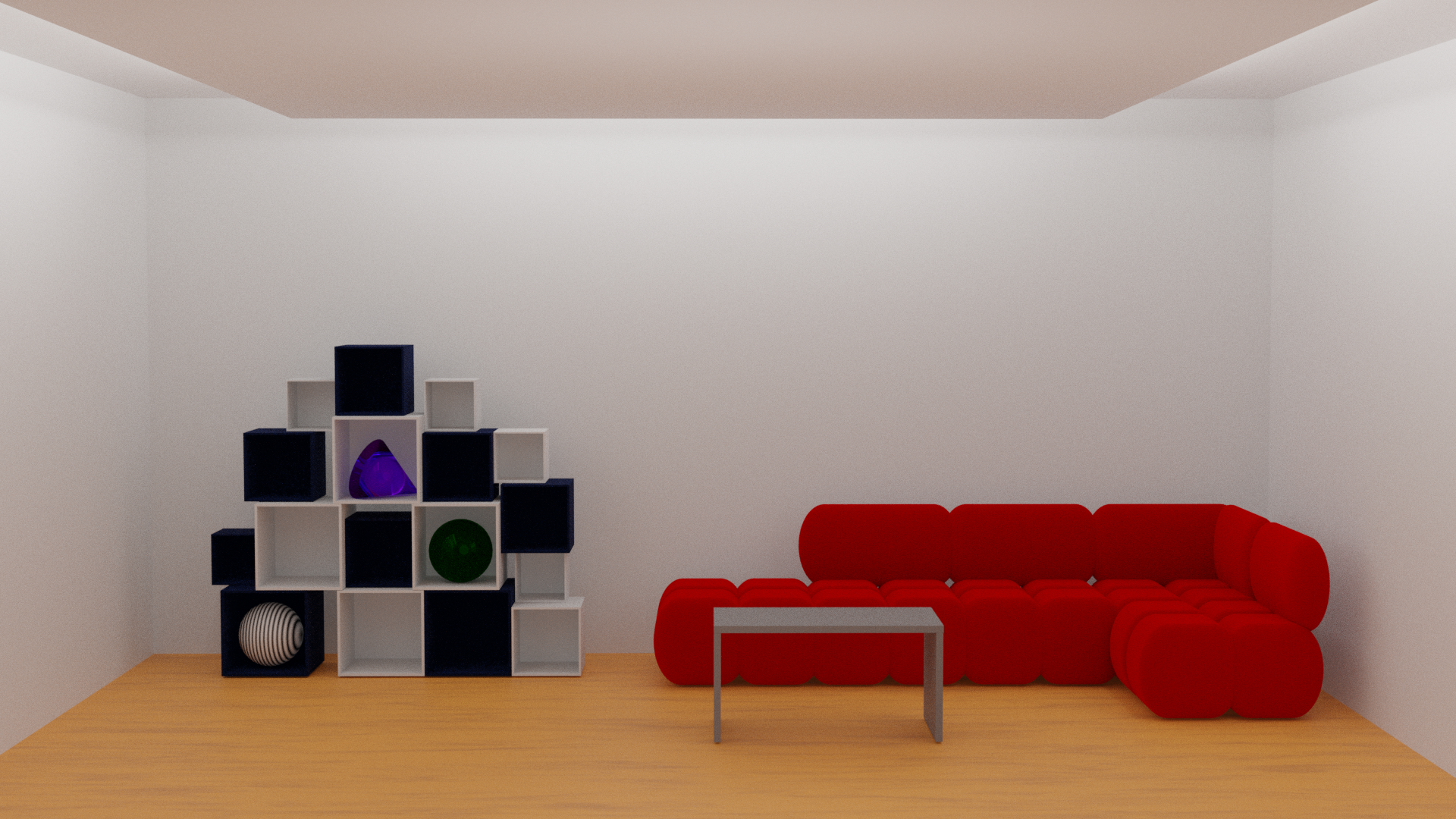
Cove light, here from a light source above roof cover
