= Digital Serial Interface =

Protocol for the controlling of lighting in building

Digital Serial Interface (DSI) is a protocol for the controlling of lighting in buildings (initially electrical ballasts). It was created in 1991 by Austrian company Tridonic and is based on Manchester-coded 8-bit protocol, data rate of 1200 baud, 1 start bit, 8 data bits (dimming value), 4 stop bits, and is the basis of the more sophisticated protocol Digital Addressable Lighting Interface (DALI).

The technology uses a single byte to communicate the lighting level (0-255 or 0x00-0xFF). DSI was the first use of digital communication in lighting control, and was the precursor to DALI.

== Advantages ==
- Its simple nature makes it straightforward to understand, implement, and diagnose, while its low voltage means it typically runs along relatively thin cables.
- Because each device has its own wire to the controller (rather than being part of a network) it has no need of an address to be set, so can be replaced simply by unplugging the faulty one and plugging in the new.
- It dims to off, so does not require mains switching equipment to turn them off.

== Disadvantages ==
- It requires one wire per control channel so a sophisticated system could have hundreds of wires, thereby making diagnoses of problems difficult.
- It is a proprietary standard initially exclusive to Tridonic and mainly brands of Tridonic's parent company Zumtobel.

== Rival protocols ==
=== ACN ===
ACN is an ANSI standard protocol adopted by the entertainment industry. It is based on Ethernet and is typically used as the backbone communication between controllers and control segments. To date few fixtures offer native ACN interface. Typically ACN is converted to DMX interface with strings of fixtures.

=== DALI ===
DALI is an open standard for digital control of lighting. Several companies have adopted the DALI protocol in their product offerings. Even though DALI is an open standard, there are already versions of its implementation emerging in different lighting manufacturers products as they strive to provide a point of difference. DSI is essentially the same technology as DALI in terms of messaging, however, DSI eliminates the individual addressing aspect of each light fitting found in DALI.

=== DMX ===
DMX is an ANSI standard protocol adopted by the entertainment industry worldwide which is also being offered on many architectural fixtures. DMX is built on ANSI standard RS-485 serial interface.

== See also ==
- Dimmer
- Lighting control console
- Lighting control system
