= Dynalite =

Control system developed in Sydney

Signify Dynalite
- Type: Public company
- Industry: Lighting Control Manufacturer
- Founded: 1987; 39 years ago in Sydney, Australia
- Founder: John Gunton
- Headquarters: Sydney, Australia, Mascot, Australia
- Area served: Worldwide
- Products: Lighting control and Building automation
- Parent: Signify N.V.
- Website: https://www.dynalite.com/

Signify Dynalite (previously Dynalite) is a lighting control and automation system developed in Sydney, Australia by John Gunton in 1987.

== Ownership ==
In 2009, Dynalite was acquired by Philips Lighting, and was renamed Philips Dynalite. In 2018 Philips spun off its lighting department, which rebranded to become Signify N.V., leading to its current name Signify Dynalite.

Signify Dynalite is Signify's global brand for connected lighting control and building automation. Its products are available globally through Signify's extensive network of Certified System Integrators (CSIs).

== Product Portfolio ==
The Dynalite system consists of:

- User Interfaces
  - Antumbra range including the AntumbraButton, AntumbraTouch, and AntumbraDisplay.
  - Revolution range.
  - PDTS (Philips Dynalite Touch Screen).
- Sensors
  - Philips Dynalite offers a range of multifunction sensors that are capable of motion detection, light level detection, and IR receive. Sensors are currently available in black and white.
- Relay Controllers
- Power Dimmers
- Signal Dimmers
  - Signal Dimmers include a range of DALI and DALI-2 certified devices.
- Multipurpose Controllers
- Integration Devices
  - Philips Dynalite provides a range of integration devices include an RS-232 Gateway, a KNX Gateway, a Fan Coil Unit Controller, and Dry Contact Input Interface. Integration is also supported through BACnet and OPC-UA.
- Network Devices
- Electrical Accessories
- Software and Apps
- Wired Systems and Demonstration Tools
  - Popular products in this category include the Kings of DALI (KoD) Demo Case, the DALI Mini Training Case, and the UI Demo Board.

For the full list of products, view Philips Dynalite's product portfolio.

== Areas and channels ==
The network components are all used to set a system of Areas and Channels. Any given lighting, fan, louvre, and relay circuit is a Channel in an Area.

For example, a house might have 3 rooms. Each room is called an Area. The kitchen may contain overhead lights, a range-hood fan and lights over the bench. These three are called Channels.

Those Areas and Channels are in states called Presets. In Preset 1, typically, all lights etc. are fully on, in Preset 4, all of the lights are off. This is all customisable either by the programmer, or if it has been allowed, by the end user as well.

So, sending 'Area 3 Preset 4' will turn off the lights in Area 3 (room 3). Sending 'Area 3 Preset 2' will set the lights to a low level, which is customisable.

Channels can also be sent presets aside from the preset of the area to which they belong. 'Area 3 Preset 4' turns off the lights, then 'Area 3 Channel 7 Preset 1' will turn that light back on.

== Communications ==
Dynalite components communicate using DyNet. The physical layer consists of a modified RS-485 TIA/EIA-485-A serial bus running along CAT5 cable, blue and blue/white carry the hot and cold signal respectively, orange and orange/white carry +12 V DC, green and green/white carry 0 V, Brown and Brown/white are unused. End of line termination is required

DyNet 1 is the most commonly used protocol over the bus, being messages of 8 bytes of data, the 8th byte being a checksum. Data is sent at speed of 9600 baud, 8 bits, no parity, 1 stopbit (8N1). Commonly there are two types of message sent via DyNet 1: logical and physical. Logical messages talk to Areas and Channels, and physical messages talk directly to the devices. These 2 are typically called 1C and 5C messages, on account of the first byte of their message.

A 1C message consist of: [1C] [Area] [Data 1] [OpCode] [Data 2] [Data 3] [Join] [Checksum]

Area is the Logical Area the message is to control.

OpCode defines the Action to be taken on the Area.

Join is a bitswitch which can be used to filter out selected channels.

An OpCode of 00 to 03 means the action is to send the given area into preset 1 to 4 plus 8 times the value of Data 3 over the time specified by Data 1 and Data 2.

An OpCode of 0A to 0D means the action is to send the given area into preset 5 to 8 plus 8 times the value of Data 3 over the time specified by Data 1 and Data 2.

That gives a possibility of 8 × 255 presets. A usual job uses 4 to 8, and generally preset 4 is reserved to 'Off' or 'all to 0%'.

DyNet 2 is used mainly to upload data to devices on the network. It allows larger messages of data to be sent at higher speeds (115200 baud), significantly reducing lag time.

== Advantages ==
Each device contains its own programmable logic controller and follows the peer-to-peer model, the main advantage of this is that there is no reliance on a single central controller, the system is capable of a high level of resilience and therefore well suited to situations where total failure could be a safety issue, such as lighting systems in public places.

The 'Message on Change' system only sends a message every time a lighting state is to change, as opposed to the DMX protocol, which is constantly streaming the entire data-map. This allows for much more devices on a single bus, but also leads to missed messages - as below.

As most of the DyNet is openly published, it is possible to integrate with third party devices.

== Disadvantages ==
The DyNet protocol offers no error correction or transmission control, each network message is sent on a 'best effort' basis. This means that if a transmitted message is corrupted or missed by a receiving device, there is nothing to pick up that the message was not received, but also makes for much faster communication and response to user input in ideal situations. The design opens the possibility of devices missing messages. In the case of a user pushing a button to turn on a light, this does not present a large problem as the user will probably notice and press the button again, but if it is an automated message say, from a timeclock, there is potential for an important message turning on outside lights of a shopping center to be missed. The usual workaround for this is to simply send the important message twice or more.

The previous Dynalite programming software (dLight 2) commonly in use up to 2011, (and still sometimes used for older equipment) was built progressively upon a Windows 3.11 application, and hides many undocumented keyboard shortcuts which are necessary to program a system.

The Envision editor was launched in 2010 and is designed to be more intuitive and easy to use. It is designed for programmers - it is not expected that end users will be able to set up their own systems, one needs training (usually free) provided by Dynalite distributors.

== Implementations ==
A selection of large scale installations of DyNet in buildings:

- Australian National Museum - Canberra (AU)
- Australian National University - Canberra (AU)
- BT Convention Centre - Liverpool (UK) convention centre
- Burj Khalifa - World's tallest building
- Burswood Entertainment Complex - Perth WA
- Crown Casino - Melbourne (AUS) Casino
- Du HQ - Du Head office Dubai
- Echo Arena Liverpool - Liverpool (UK) arena
- Gold Coast Convention and Exhibition Centre - Gold Coast QLD
- Google - Office in Bogota, Colombia
- Grand Hyatt - Dubai hotel
- Jin Mao Building - Previously China's tallest building
- Manolas Residence - Perth WA
- Te Papa - New Zealand museum
- National Museum of Scotland - Edinburgh Scotland (UK) Museum
- Perth Convention Exhibition Centre - Perth WA
- Suncorp Stadium - Australian Olympic venue
- The Roundhouse - London (UK) theatre
- Titan Plaza - Mall in Bogota, Colombia
- Trafford Centre - Manchester (UK) shopping mall
- Westfield - London (UK) shopping mall
- RAC Arena - Perth WA

== See also ==
- Home automation
- Intelligent building
- Lighting control system
- Smart Environments
- Room automation
- touch panel

== Sources ==
- Dynalite's showcase page
- Dynalite's technical documentation page
