= DyNet =

Communications network and communications protocol

DyNet is the communications network and communications protocol for Dynalite lighting automation and building automation. It is now part of Signify.

== Design ==
The network runs on a 4-twisted-pair cable of 100Ω 100 MHz CAT5E https://dynamicconnectcable.com/unshielded-cable or a flat cable with RS485 serial port, usually with a RJ-12 connector. A daisy-chain serial network topology is strongly recommended with no stubs. The recommended cable colour-coding is:

- Green/White pair = paralleled for GND
- Orange/White pair = paralleled for +12V
- Blue/White pair = blue for DATA+ and white for DATA-
- Brown/White pair = spare or shield if unshielded cable is used.
