= IEC 60929 =

IEC 60929 is an international standard created by the International Electrotechnical Commission and covers electronic ballasts used in AC supplies with voltages up to 1000 V and with operating frequencies at 50 Hz or 60 Hz. The actual operating frequency may deviate from the specified supply frequency. The 2011 standard was renamed and extended to cover "control gear" rather than "electronic ballast", and DC circuits as well as AC circuits.

The standard essentially covered the same material as IEC 60921, but was considerably more complex due to the high frequency aspect of electronic ballasts. Appendix E of the standard defines the DALI, which specifies how ballasts (and other control gear) are controlled.
