= AMX192 =

Lighting control standard

AMX192 (often referred to simply as AMX) is an analog lighting communications protocol used to control stage lighting. It was developed by Strand Century in the late 1970s. Originally, AMX192 was only capable of controlling 192 discrete channels of lighting. Later, multiple AMX192 streams were supported by some lighting desks. AMX192 has mostly been replaced in favour of DMX, and is typically only found in legacy hardware.

== History ==
The name AMX192 is derived from analog multiplexing and the maximum number of controllable lighting channels (192). AMX was developed to address a significant problems in controlling dimmers. For many years, in order to send a control signal from a lighting control unit to the dimmer units, the only method available was to provide a dedicated wire from the control unit to each dimmer (analogue control) where the voltage present on the wire was varied by the control unit to set the output level of the dimmer. In the late 1970s, the AMX192 serial analogue multiplexing standard was developed in the US, permitting one cable to control several dimmers.

At about the same time, D54 was developed in the United Kingdom, and differed from AMX192 in that it used an embedded clocking scheme. AMX192 used a separate differential clock with a driver circuit similar to RS-485, but current limited on each leg with 100Ω resistors.

== See also ==
- Dimmer
- Lighting control console
- Lighting control system
- DMX512
- RDM
