= Systems integrator =

Person or organization which performs systems integration

A systems integrator (or system integrator) is a person or company that specializes in bringing together component subsystems into a whole and ensuring that those subsystems function together, a practice known as system integration. They also solve problems of automation. Systems integrators may work in many fields but the term is generally used in the information technology (IT) field such as computer networking, the defense industry, the mass media, enterprise application integration, business process management or manual computer programming. Data quality issues are an important part of the work of systems integrators.

== Required skills ==
A system integration engineer needs a broad range of skills and is likely to be defined by a breadth of knowledge rather than a depth of knowledge. These skills are likely to include software, systems and enterprise architecture, software and hardware engineering, interface protocols, and general problem solving skills. It is likely that the problems to be solved have not been solved before except in the broadest sense. They are likely to include new and challenging problems with an input from a broad range of engineers where the system integration engineer "pulls it all together."

== Performance technology integration ==
Systems integrators generally have to be good at matching clients needs with existing products. An inductive reasoning aptitude is useful for quickly understanding how to operate a system or a GUI. A systems integrator will tend to benefit from being a generalist, knowing a lot about a large number of products. Systems integration includes a substantial amount of diagnostic and troubleshooting work. The ability to research existing products and software components is also helpful. Creation of these information systems may include designing or building customized prototypes or concepts.

== In the defense industry ==
In the defense industry, the job of 'Systems Integration' engineer is growing in importance as defense systems become more 'connected'. As well as integrating new systems, the task of integrating current systems is attracting a lot of research and effort. It is only in recent years that systems have started to be deployed that can interconnect with each other; most systems were designed as 'stovepipe' designs with no thought to future connectivity.

The current problem is how to harness all the information available, from the various information generators (or sensors) into one complete picture.

As well as the design of the actual interfaces much effort is being put into presenting the information in a useful manner. The level of information, needed by the different levels in the military structure, and the relevance of the information (information can become outdated in seconds) is so variable that it may be necessary to have more than one system connected.

Another problem is how information is networked. The Internet may seem to be an obvious solution, but it is vulnerable to denial of service and physical destruction of the key 'hubs'. One answer is to use a dedicated military communication system, but the bandwidth needed would be astronomical in such a system.

Army Warrant Officer (United States) military occupational specialty (MOS) 140A – Command and Control Systems Technician is an example of a systems integrator in the defense industry. 140A Warrant Officers assigned to Brigade Combat Teams (BCT) integrate systems with multiple operating systems (OS) and hardware configurations – that include: UNIX, Linux & Microsoft Windows Others can fill a similar role at the Division level and higher.

== In entertainment and architectural controls ==
In entertainment and architectural installations, systems integrators function as a designer/engineer, bringing together a wide array of components from various manufacturers to accomplish the goal of creating a unified, functioning system that meets the needs of the client. Systems integrators are usually involved in the selection of instruments and control components from among various OEMs to determine the specific mix of output, function, interconnection, program storage, controls, and user interfaces required for specific projects. The integrator is generally responsible for generating the control riser, collaborating with the lighting consultant/ AV consultant on the function programming, and will commission the system once installed. Often (but not always) the system integrator will also be the vendor for projects they are commissioning, and will collaborate with the lighting designer on the artistic design. As lighting and A/V systems increase in their level of sophistication, and the number of manufacturers for components of these systems increases, so does the demand for systems integrators.

Common data protocols involved in entertainment and architectural systems are Digital Multiplexing (or DMX512-A), Remote Device Management (or RDM), Art-Net, ACN or sACN (Streaming Architecture for Control Networks), Analog, and various proprietary control software from a variety of manufacturers. Systems Integrators design many distributed nodes in traditional star or ring topologies, or customize system layout for specific installations. The network will have a hierarchy of main and sub-control stations with varying degrees of access. The network can be designed such that the controls for this system can be on an established timeline, or controlled in real time by astronomical clocks, audio/motion/IR sensors, or various means of user interface (buttons, touch-pads, consoles). This system might utilize a primary controller that can access the entire system, and satellite control interfaces linked via a network backbone that would determine functionality based on access codes. For example, a casino might use a networked system that interfaces with architectural lighting, stage lighting, special effects (such as fog machines or fountains), and media content routed to a media server. The primary controller would have access to all devices on the network, while individual control stations could have varying levels of functionality. A ballroom might have a multi-button panel that would adjust lighting only in that ballroom, while a cabaret space with a stage would require an access code that would give employees access to the stage lighting, while the IT manager could use the same panel to access the main controls for the networks.

== In the automation industry ==
System Integrators in the automation industry typically provide the product and application experience in implementing complex automation solutions. Often, System Integrators are aligned with automation vendors, joining their various System Integrator programs for access to development products, resources and technical support. System integrators are tightly linked to their accounts and often are viewed as the engineering departments for small manufacturers, handling their automation system installation, commissioning, long term maintenance and security.

== See also ==
- Enterprise application integration
- Control System Integrators Association
- EDI
