= Avolites =

British multinational technology company

Avolites Ltd
- Company type: Subsidiary
- Industry: Professional stage lighting and media control systems
- Headquarters: London, United Kingdom
- Key people: JB Toby (Technical Director); Steve Warren (Brand Ambassador)
- Products: ART 2020; ART 2000 series; ART 2000 PowerCube; Sapphire Touch; Arena; Tiger Touch I/Pro/II; Tiger Touch Wing; Quartz; Titan Mobile; Titan Mobile Wing; Titan One; TitanNet Processor; TitanNet Switch; Truss DMX Splitter; Rack DMX Splitter; Ai Infinity series; Ai S-series; Ai EX-series; Ai R-series; Ai RX-series; Ai Software Licenses
- Parent: ROBE LIGHTING SRO (2023 - present)
- Website: avolites.com

Avolites Ltd is a multinational technology company based in Park Royal, London. Avolites manufactures high end professional lighting control consoles, stage dimming equipment, and media servers for use in the professional stage lighting and media control systems industries. In 2011 the company expanded into the media server sector of the entertainments technology market by acquiring software developed by Immersive Ltd, supplying control systems used in the 2012 Summer Olympics opening ceremony, and the 2014 Winter Olympics opening ceremony. The company has received awards for many of its products, including the ART-series dimmers, the Sapphire Media, and the Ai media server software.

== History ==
Avolites started as a lighting production company in 1976 when a group of touring road crew formed a company to manufacture their designs for a touring dimmer rack, the Avolites FD dimmer. The company then expanded into manufacturing lighting control consoles, initially releasing the 8100 series, before creating the QM500 series in 1983. During the 1980s the reputation of the brand grew and by the late 1980s the company was purchased by Carlton Television. The company was returned to private ownership as part of a management buy out in 1991. Eventually the lighting production work was discontinued and the company focused on equipment manufacturing only.

During the 1990s the company introduced several new products designed to control the range of intelligent lighting products that were emerging onto the market at the time, releasing the Rolacue Sapphire, Pearl 2000 (released 1995), Sapphire 2000 (released 1998) and Diamond II/III consoles. Most of these consoles were based on Motorola 68000 family processors. In 1996 the company also updated the FD dimmer, replacing it with the Art 4000.

During the 2000s the dimmer product range was redesigned again, resulting in the Art 2000 series of racks; the Art 2000i installation racks and - in the later part of the decade - the PowerCube dimmer/distribution units. In 2001 Avolites launched the Diamond 4 range of control consoles, which was based on a conventional PC motherboard instead of custom made hardware reliant on Motorola processors. Although the custom hardware consoles were still sold and updated in stages during the 2000s, the company gradually moved software development towards the Windows OS running on conventional PC motherboards. This move allowed the company to re-write its lighting control software, resulting in the release of the Titan software series in the late 2000s.

Since the introduction of Titan the company has designed a range of consoles specifically to run the software, including the Titan One USB DMX dongle, Titan Mobile, Tiger Touch and Sapphire Touch consoles, which were all introduced between 2009 and 2012.

On the 6th June 2023, it was announced that Robe, a popular Czech lighting manufacturer, had agreed to acquire Avolites in its entirety. On the 8th September that year, TPI released an article detailing the key points the acquisition

=== Avolites Media ===
David Green, Mark Calvert and Ralph Lambert formed a VJ collective known as Inside-Us-All initially working on visual effects for the rave and party scene. The trio decided to expand into more corporate work and took on a new staff member, John Munro, forming the Pixel Addicts company at the time. Pixel Addicts was later renamed to Immersive and it was within Immersive that the "Addict" media server software was developed.

In June 2011, Avolites acquired the rights to the Addict media server software developed by Immersive, rebranded it as "Ai" and formed a spin-off company called Avolites Media. The media server products were used in the Olympic opening and closing ceremonies of 2012 to perform video mapping across the audience seats.

=== Management changes ===
In October 2012, the company appointed JB Toby and Koy Neminathan as Technical Director and Sales Director respectively. Steve Warren moved into the position of Business Development Director.

In February 2018, Paul Wong was appointed as managing director, replacing Richard Salzedo who is now the group chairman.

== Products ==
Avolites has manufactured a wide range of lighting control products, accessories and software, but is best known for its range of control consoles and dimmer racks.

- 1977 B100 Console,
- 1978 FC Dimmers,
- 1983 QM500 Console,
- 1992 Rolacue Sapphire,
- 1994 Rolacue Pearl,
- 1999 Pearl 2000,
- 2001 Diamond 4,
- 2006 Pearl Expert,
- 2008 Titan v1,
- 2011 Tiger Touch,
- 2013 Expert Pro,
- 2018 Ai Q3 Media Server,
- 2021 Diamond 9 (D9-215 and D9-330)
- 2024 Diamond 7 (D7-215 and D7-330)
- 2025 D3 Series (D3-010, D3-110, D3 Wing, D3 Core and D3 Touch)
