= ETC Eos =

Line of lighting control console

Eos refers to both a range of lighting control consoles and the accompanying software, produced by ETC. The Eos software was first introduced in 2006 along with the Eos Classic lighting console. Eos provides the user with control of the lights connected to it, outputting over DMX, streaming ACN and Art-Net.

== Basic principles ==
=== Channels and addresses ===
A channel represents an individual fixture, which can take up many different addresses. The type of fixture is determined by the selected fixture profile, which defines how the DMX addresses are mapped to different parameters. For parameters that require finer control, such as colour and pan/tilt, two DMX addresses can be assigned, increasing the possible range of values from 0–255 to 0–65535.

=== Cues ===
A cue is a snapshot of the values of selected channels at a given point which are recallable at any time. They are stored in cue lists, which can be assigned to any physical fader on the lighting desk for playback. Eos can store a maximum of 1,000 cue lists, each holding a maximum of 10,000 cues.

==== Tracking and cue-only modes ====
Eos can either operate in tracking or cue-only mode. In tracking mode, which is the default, channels are only recorded into a cue when their value changes. In cue-only mode, each channel's value is recorded into every cue. The Track/Q Only button will invert the behaviour of the console for a single record or update operation.

Tracking mode example (dashes indicate tracked values)
Channel Cue	1	2	3
1	70	66	60
2	60	80	0
3	70	−	−
4	−	70	−

Cue-only mode example
Channel Cue	1	2	3
1	70	66	60
2	60	80	0
3	70	80	0
4	70	70	0

== Hardware ==
ETC also produces a range of lighting consoles that run the Eos software.

=== Consoles Hardware ===
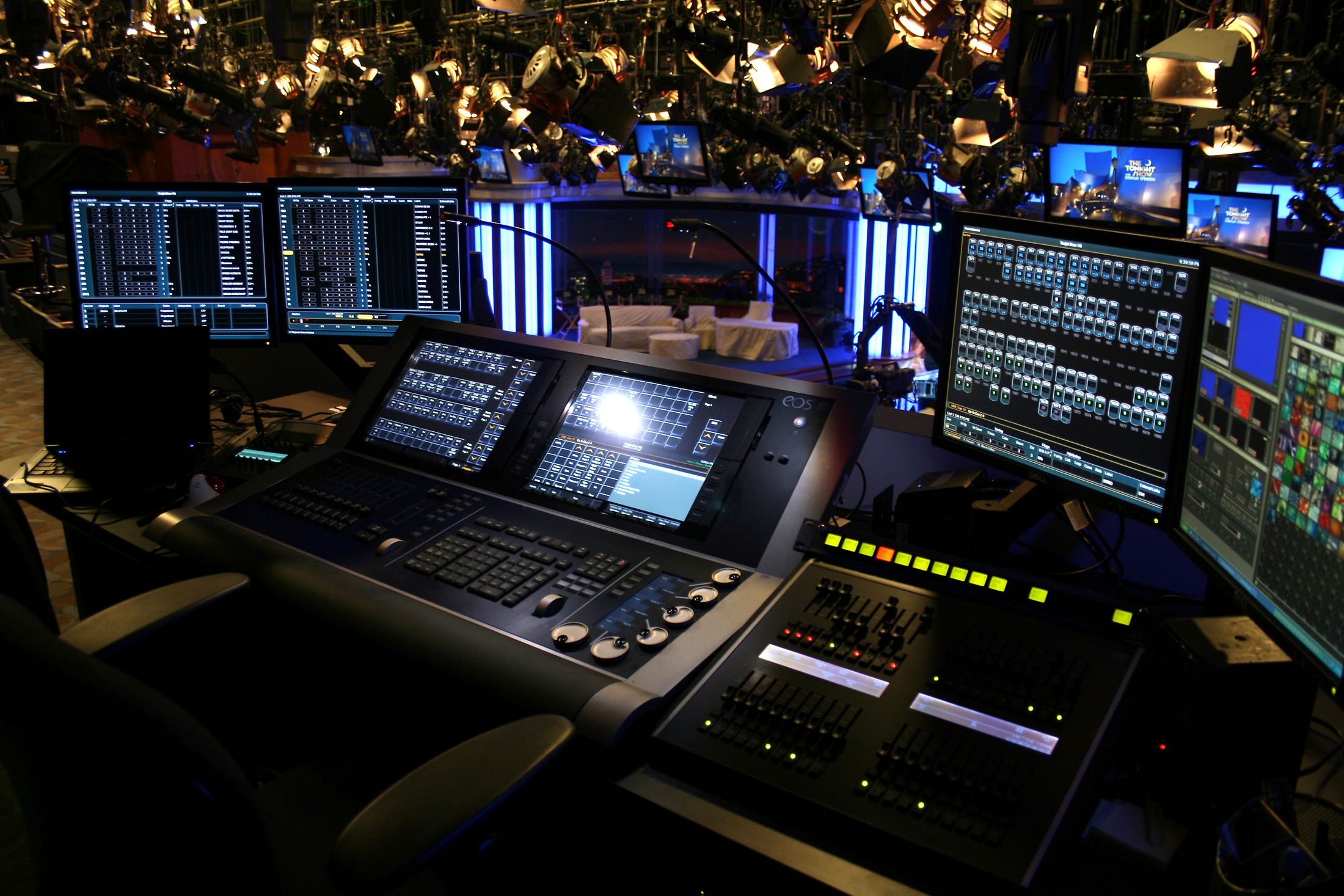
An Eos Console (2009)

==== Apex ====
The Apex is ETC's flagship line of consoles. It comes in four variants, the 5, 10, 20 (Referring to the number of faders each model has) as well as Apex FP. The Apex 5 is the smallest in the range, with one main 23.8" display, five faders and twenty Target Keys (configurable buttons with OLED displays beneath them). The Apex 10 has two 23.8" displays, ten faders and forty Target keys. The Apex 20 has twenty faders and fifty Target Keys. Apex FP is a Headless version on the Apex 5, the twenty Target Keys have been replaced with 10 just above the encoders.

==== Gio @5 ====
The Gio @5 is ETC's mid-range lighting console. It has one main 18.3" display, with a smaller 4.3" display to show the status of the five faders. It also has twenty reconfigurable buttons next to the display, which default to being Macro 801–820.

==== Ion Xe ====
The Ion Xe is another mid-range lighting console. It differs from the Gio and Apex by having no internal display, instead supporting two external monitors at resolutions up to 4K. The Ion Xe 20 is available with an added bank of twenty assignable faders.

==== Element 2 ====
The Element 2 is ETC's budget lighting console, designed for smaller rigs of mainly generic fixtures. It is the only current Eos console to have added software limitations, being limited to a single cue list and having AutoMark always enabled. It has forty faders which can control the first 120 channels or the first 80 submasters, controlled by a fader page switch, in addition to the standard Eos keypad. Due to the lack of encoder wheels, non-intensity parameters are controlled using the moving light controls popup.

=== On-PC Based Software (Nomad) ===
As well as running on the Eos consoles, Eos is provided for Windows and Mac personal computers at no cost, with the only limitation being that it cannot output any DMX data. This functionality can be enabled with either a 1024-address or 6144-address ETCNomad key.
