= Non-dim circuit =

Lighting circuit

A non-dim circuit is a special electrical network. In theater, it is a type of outlet usually controlled from the stage manager's panel or from the Lighting control console . The word non-dim is used to distinguish this type of circuit which operates only in on or off modes, from a dimmer, which can be at any intensity on a continuum. It is generally a remotely operated relay.

Many modern computerized lighting systems allow a dimmer to be set as "non-dim" and controlled using the Lighting control console, however, this can be less desirable than using a "true" switched circuit, as the Triac in the dimmer never truly supplies a "proper" sine wave, which can cause damage to equipment.

Non-Dims are often used to allow switched equipment such as motors, hazers or other similar electrical equipment to be triggered as part of a lighting cue. Sometimes house work lights or stage work lights can be controlled using a non-dimmed circuit. It is also sometimes used to provide power to intelligent lights, however this may not be considered desirable as any mistakes made at the Lighting control console could interrupt the power supply to the fixture which often are not capable of hot restrike (turning on the lamp again while power is still connected) due to their use of a Metal halide lamp or similar lamp.

The term "non-dim" has come to refer to any circuit, outlet, relay or otherwise that 1) cannot be controlled by a Lighting control console or 2) is a circuit controlled by the Lighting control console but has been set up not to dim.

== Sources ==
- Briggs, Jody (2015). "Non-Dim or Non-Dim circuit". Encyclopedia of Stage Lighting. McFarland & Company. p. 245. ISBN 9781476603001.
- Dunham, Richard E. (2018). Stage Lighting: The Fundamentals, Second Edition. Taylor & Francis. ISBN 9781315454672.
- Mort, Skip (2015). Stage Lighting: The Technicians' Guide: An On-the-job Reference Tool with Online Video Resources - 2nd Edition. Bloomsbury Publishing. ISBN 9781474212717.
