= Compulite =

Compulite Systems (2000) Ltd.
- Company type: Private company limited by shares
- Industry: Professional stage lighting and media control systems
- Headquarters: Hod HaSharon, Israel
- Key people: Mr. Yehuda Shukrun (CEO and Owner)
- Website: compulite.com

Compulite is an Israel-based company that designs and builds lighting control console, dimmers and other theatre lighting related equipment.

== History ==
Compulite was founded in 1978 by Dan Redler and Alfred Senator.

In 1978, Compulite was the first company to release a lighting console that uses a microprocessor.

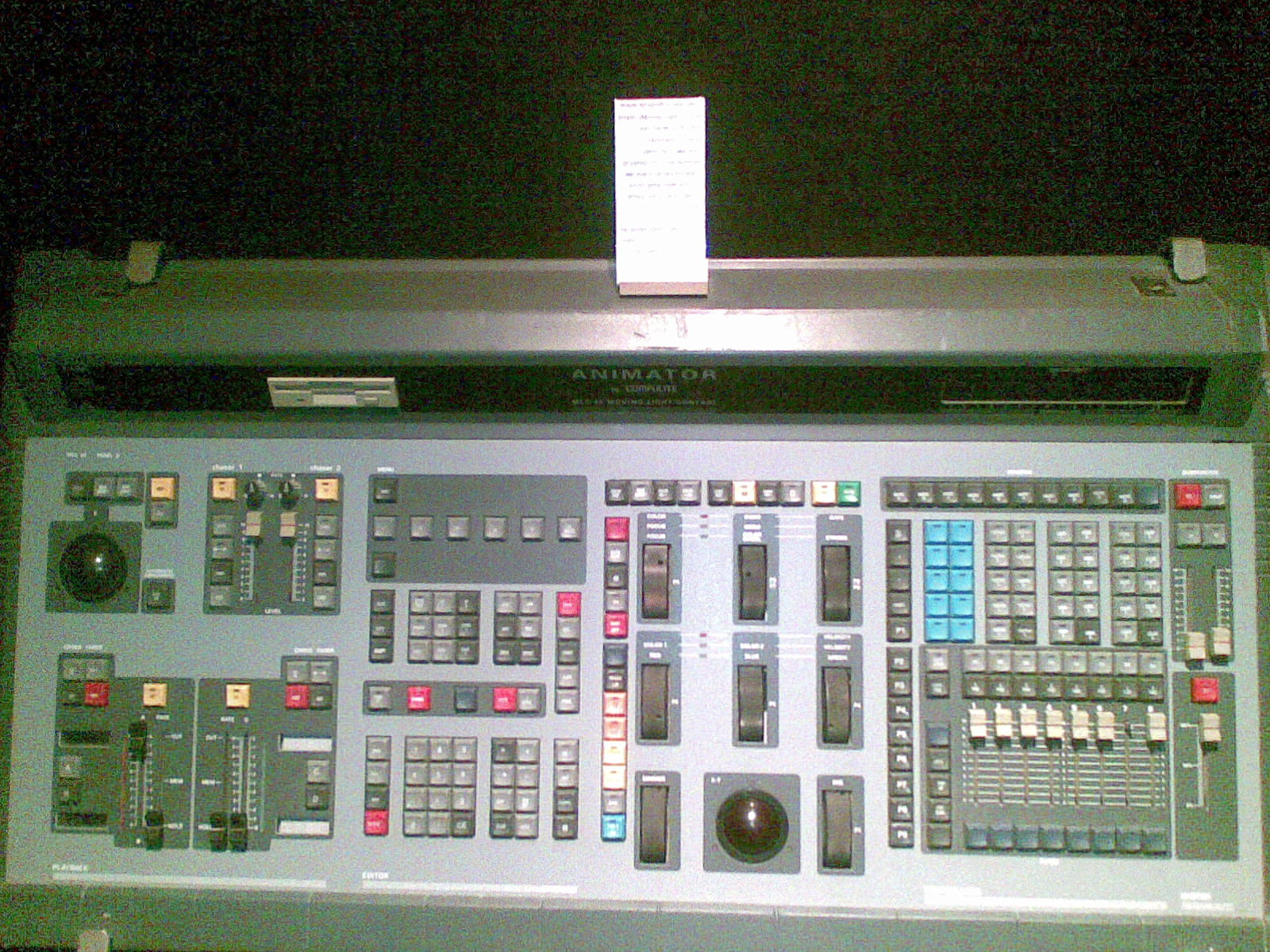
Compulite Animator, released in 1990, displayed at the Stage Lighting Museum

The Compulite Animator, released in 1990, was one of the first consoles to use DMX512 for the generic control of automated fixtures and dimmers simultaneously.

In 2009, Compulite was one of five companies in the world producing high density modular sine-wave dimmers fit for use in theatre.

== Management ==
Compulite is privately owned by Mr. Yehuda Shukrun, the CEO of the company.

In 2015, co-founders Mr. Dan Redler and Mr. Alfred Senator retired.

== Products ==
Compulite has manufactured a wide range of lighting control products, accessories and software, but is best known for its range of control consoles and dimmer racks.
