= SACN =

SACN can mean

- South American Community of Nations, a former customs union
- Scientific Advisory Committee on Nutrition, a United Kingdom government body
- Streaming Architecture for Control Networks, a technology standard in the entertainment industry
