= Entertainment Services and Technology Association =

American non-profit trade association

- Established: 1987 (39 years ago)
- Headquarters: New York City
- Part of: Professional Lighting and Sound Association
- Website: www.esta.org

The Entertainment Services & Technology Association (ESTA) is an American non-profit trade association that represents the entertainment technology industry and is dedicated to promoting professionalism and growth within it. It also provides a forum where interested parties can exchange ideas and information, create standards and recommend certain practices, and face problems in terms of training and certification.

ESTA members provide a wide variety of products and services to the industry, which range from large corporations to individual designers. Its members include distributors, manufacturers, companies in the field of service and production, designers and consultants.

ESTA is currently in charge of reviewing the DMX512 protocol (Digital MultipleX) as well as the development of the new sACN protocol (Streaming Architecture for Control Networks), both communications protocols used to control the lighting of scenarios and special effects.

== History ==
In 2010 ESTA merged with PLASA and demerged in 2015.

As of January 2011 ESTA, the Entertainment Services and Technology Association in North America, has merged with the Professional Lighting and Sound Association, a similar organization in the UK. The new organization was called PLASA. In 2015 PLASA Governing Body chairman John Simpson announced that the organisation had been facing "critical cash-flow problems", precipitating the sale of its Eastbourne office, staff reductions, business restructuring and a reduction in services provided to members. In addition, the de-merger of the American arm of the organisation into a separate body.

All ESTA standards are now maintained by ESTA.

== Standards ==
In 1994 the ESTA started a technical standards program for the development of industry standards. This program is officially recognized by ANSI as a "Standards Developer". Standards developed by the ESTA go through life as ANSI E1.-number-year - description .

Example standards are:

- ANSI E1.11-2004 / ANSI E1.11-2008 - DMX512
- ANSI E1.17-2006 - Advanced Control Network or Architecture for Control Networks
- ANSI E1.20-2006 - Remote Device Management via DMX512
