= Intelligent lighting =

Automated light fixtures

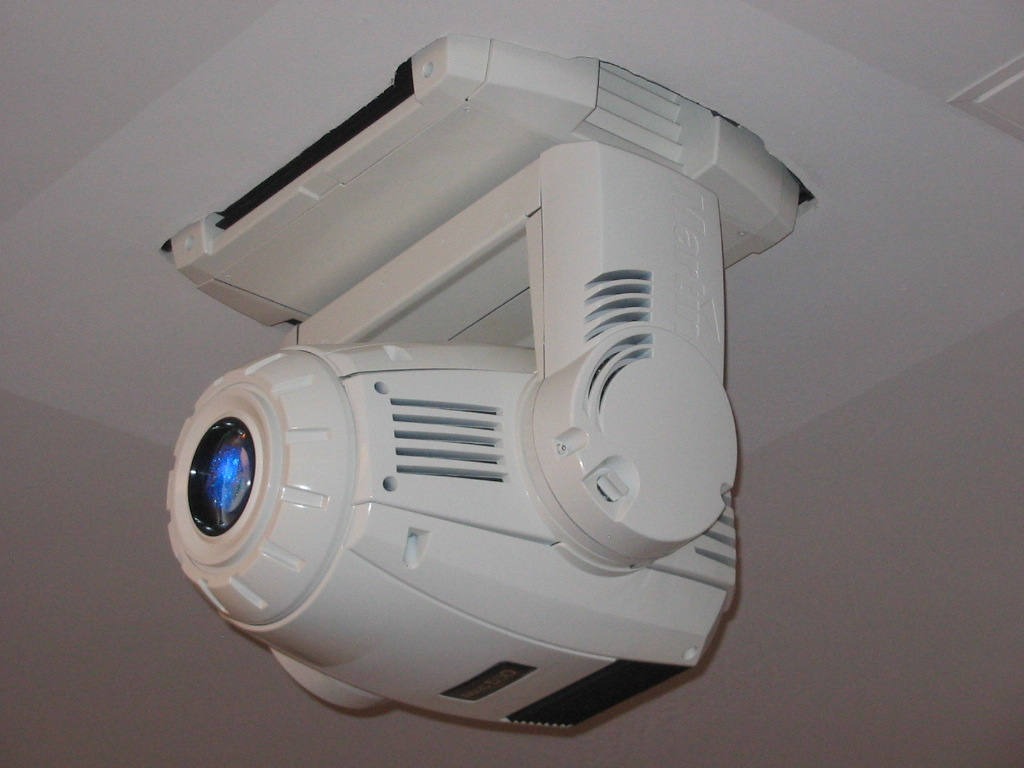
A Martin MAC 550 intelligent light

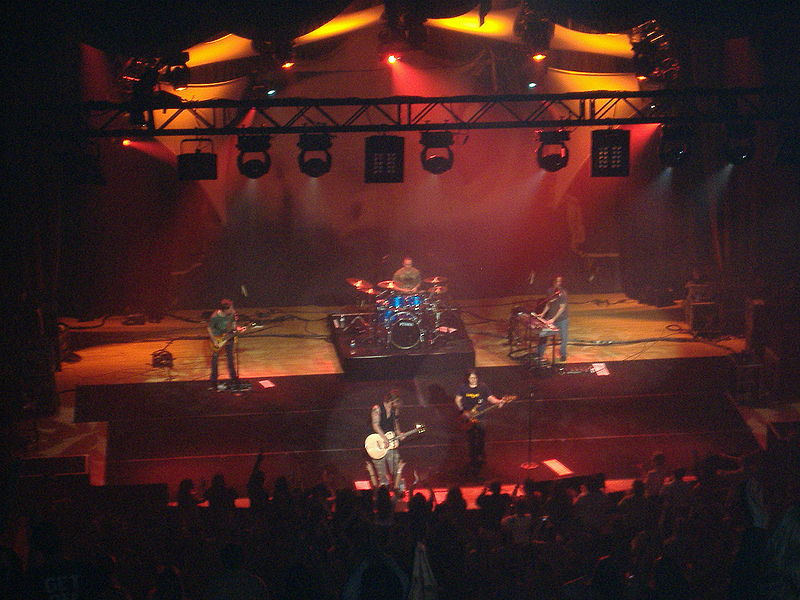
Several intelligent lights in use at a concert. Note the white beams they produce.

Intelligent lighting refers to lighting that has automated or mechanical abilities beyond those of conventional, stationary illumination. Although the most advanced intelligent lights can produce extraordinarily complex effects, the intelligence lies with the human lighting designer, control system programmer, or the lighting operator, rather than the fixture itself. Intelligent lighting (ILS) is also known as automated lighting, moving lights, moving heads, or simply movers.

More recently the term has fallen into disuse as abilities once reserved to a specific category of lighting instruments (most notably colour changing and variable focus) have become pervasive across a range of fixtures. The distinction has become more blurred with the introduction of machines that would not be considered lights but share the ability to move their orientation and are operated by the same DMX512 control protocol, such as moving yoke projectors.

== History ==
There are many patents for intelligent lighting dating back from 1906, with Edmond Sohlberg of Kansas City, USA. The lantern used a carbon-arc bulb and was operated not by motors or any form of electronics, but by cords that were operated manually to control pan, tilt and zoom.

1925 saw the first use of electrical motors to move the fixture, and with it the beam position, by Herbet F. King (US patent number: 1,680,685). In 1936 US patent number 2,054,224 was granted to a similar device, with which the pan and tilt were controlled by means of a joystick as opposed to switches. From this point on until 1969, various other inventors made similar lights and improved on the technology, but with no major breakthroughs. During this period, Century Lighting (now Strand) started retailing such units specially made to order, retrofitted onto any of their existing lanterns up to 750 W to control pan and tilt.

George Izenour made the next breakthrough in 1969 with the first ever fixture to use a mirror on the end of an ellipsoidal to redirect the beam of light remotely. In 1969, Jules Fisher, from Casa Mañana area theatre in Texas saw the invention and use of 12 PAR 64 lanterns with 120 W, 12 V lamps fitted, 360 degrees of pan and 270 degrees of tilt, a standard that lasted until the 1990s. This lamp was also known as the 'Mac-Spot'

In Bristol in 1968, progress was also being made, mainly for use in live music. Peter Wynne Wilson refers to the use of 1 kW profiles, with slides onto which gobos were printed, inserted from a reel just like on a slide projector. The fixtures also had an iris and a multiple colored gel wheel. These lights were also fitted with mirrors and made for an impressive light show for a Pink Floyd gig in London. Another fixture known as the 'Cycklops' was also used for music in the USA, although it was limited in terms of capabilities. With only pan, tilt, and color functions, and at 1.2 meters long and weighing in at 97 kilograms including the ballast, they were heavy and cumbersome. These units were designed more for replacing the ever unreliable local spotlight operators.

In 1978 a Dallas, Texas-based lighting and sound company called Showco began developing a lighting fixture that changed color by rotating dichroic filters. During its development, the designers decided to add motors to motorize pan and tilt. They demonstrated the fixture for the band Genesis in a barn in England in 1980. The band decided to financially back the project. Showco spun off their lighting project into a company called Vari-Lite, and the first fixture was also called the Vari-lite. It also used one of the first lighting desks with a digital core and this enabled lighting states to be programmed in.

Genesis was later to order 55 Vari-lites to use in their next chain of gigs across the UK. The lights were supplied with a Vari-Lite console which had 32 channels, five 1802 processors and a dramatic improvement of the first console which was very simple and had an external processing unit.

In 1986 Vari-Lite introduced a new series of lighting fixtures and control consoles. They referred to the new system as their Series 200, with the new lights designated "VL-2 Spot Luminaire", and "VL-3 Wash Luminaire". The Series 200 system was controlled by the Artisan console. Vari-Lite retroactively named the original system "series-100". The Original Vari-Lite console was retroactively named the "series 100 console" and the original Vari-Lite was retroactively named the "VL-1 Spot Luminaire". The prototype fixture shown to Genesis in 1980 was re-designated the "VL-zero" in the mid-1990s to keep the naming consistent.

In 1985, the first moving head to use the DMX512 protocol was produced by Summa Technologies. Up until that time, moving lights were using other communication protocols, such as DIN8, AMX, D54 and the proprietary protocols of other companies, such as VariLite, Tasco, High End and Coemar. The Summa HTI had a 250 W HTI bulb, two colour wheels, a gobo wheel, a mechanical dimmer and zoom functions.

The first purchasable/mass-produced scanner was the Coemar Robot, first produced in 1986. Initially produced with either the GE MARC350 lamp, or the Philips SN250. Later versions were factory equipped with the Osram HTI400, a modification that High End Systems had been doing since 1987. The Robot used model aircraft servo motors to control Pan, Tilt, Color and Gobo, with the gobo wheel providing the shutter function as well. The Color wheel had 4 dichroic color filters (red, blue, yellow, and green), and the gobo wheel contained four stamped patterns (non-replaceable). The Robot communicated with a proprietary 8-bit protocol, yet had no microprocessors/pal's/pics/ram, O/S or other modern logic device.

In 1987, Clay Paky began producing their first scanners, the Golden Scan 1 & Crystal Scan. They utilized stepper motors instead of servos and used a HMI 575 lamp, bright and with a far more uniform beam brightness. This was followed by the Intellabeam in 1989, released by High End, who at the time were the distributors for Clay Paky.

In the 1990s, the future came closer with Martin, a Danish Company that produced fog machines. They began to manufacture a line of scanners known as Roboscans, with a variety of different specifications for different users. They were named for their wattages, with a range starting with 1004 and 1016. Later came the 804 and 805, designed for small venues. Other models were the 218, 518, 812, 918 and 1200Pro units. Martin also produced a whole new range of Moving Heads called the Martin MAC Series. This series is still popular today, with new fixtures such as the MAC III and MAC Viper, which are among the highest quality moving lights.

The most recent development in intelligent lighting is digital lighting, with fixtures such as High End Systems' DL3. These fixtures consist of a bright LCD or DLP projector mounted on a moving yoke, much like that of an ordinary moving head. These fixtures also contain an integrated media server, which allows for millions of colour choices, endless libraries of gobo-like images, and projection of images and video.

== Types ==
Moving head lights are commonly divided into four main categories: spot, wash, beam, and hybrid.

- Spot fixtures are designed for precise projections, often using gobos to create patterns and shapes.
- Wash fixtures provide a softer, wide beam of light for general stage coverage and color washes.
- Beam fixtures generate a narrow, concentrated shaft of light that is highly visible in atmospheric effects like haze or smoke.
- Hybrid fixtures combine features of the other types, allowing them to function as spot, wash, and beam units depending on programming.

This categorization is widely used in stage and event lighting design.

== Features ==
An automated light, properly called a luminaire, fixture (or sometimes moving head), is a versatile and multi-function instrument designed to replace multiple conventional, non-moving lights. Depending on the venue and application, automated luminaires can be a versatile and economical addition to a stock of traditional lights because, with proper programming, they can swiftly alter many aspects of their optics, changing the “personality” of the light very quickly. Lighting is typically pre-programmed and played back using only simple commands, although moving heads can be controlled “live” if the operator is sufficiently experienced.

Most moving heads have all or some of the following features. Each one is set to a channel number.

- Panning
- Tilt
- Fine Pan
- Fine Tilt
- Pan/Tilt Speed
- Dimmer
- Shutter
- Zoom
- Focus
- Iris
- Gobo 1 Select
- Gobo 1 Rotation (Direction & Speed)
- Gobo 2 Select
- Gobo 2 Rotation (Direction & Speed)
- Gobo 3 Select
- Gobo Animation Wheel
- Colour 1
- Colour 2
- Cyan
- Magenta
- Yellow
- CTO
- Prism (either 3,4,8, 16 facet circular or 6 facet linear)
- Prism Rotation (direction)
- Prism Rotation (speed)
- Effects Wheel
- Frost
- Lamp Shut off
- Fixture Reset
- Remote Patching
- RDM

== Control ==
Moving lights are controlled in many ways. Usually the fixtures are connected to a lighting control console, which outputs a control signal. This control signal sends data to the fixture usually in one of three ways: Analogue (which has largely been phased out), DMX (which stands for "Digital Multiplex", also the industry standard control protocol), or Ethernet Control (such as ArtNet or sACN). The fixture then takes this signal and translates it into internal signals which are sent to the many stepper motors located inside.

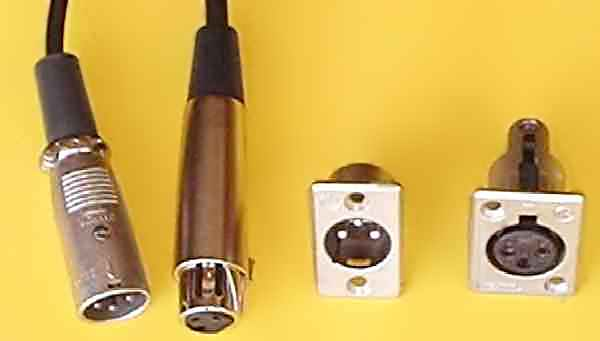
XLR connectors, the most common method of controlling moving heads. Note that these are 3-pin XLR connectors, which are used by some manufacturers, rather than the 5-pin, which is specified by the USITT DMX-512 Standard.

The vast majority of moving heads are controlled using the DMX protocol, usually using dedicated twisted pair, shielded cable with 5-pin XLR connectors at the ends. Each fixture is assigned a block of DMX channels in one of the venue's DMX universes (a self-contained set of cables and fixtures which can operate a maximum of 512 individual channels). The central lighting desk transmits data on these channels which the intelligent fixture interprets as value settings for each of its many variables, including color, pattern, focus, prism, pan (horizontal swing), tilt (vertical swing), rotation speed, and animation.

Since moving heads did not attain prominence until DMX's predecessor, AMX, or Analog Multiplex had passed the zenith of its popularity. Very few moving heads use analogue control, due to crippling restrictions on bandwidth, data transfer speeds and potential inaccuracy. Some of the most modern intelligent fixtures use RJ-45 or Ethernet cabling for data transfer, due to the increased bandwidth available to control increasingly complicated effects. Using the new Ethernet technology, control surfaces are now able to control a much larger array of automated fixtures.

The most recent development in lighting control is RDM (lighting), or Remote Device Management. This protocol allows for communication between the lighting controller and fixtures. With RDM, users can troubleshoot, address, configure, and identify fixtures from the RDM enabled lighting desk.

Moving lights are programmed using a fixture box in ETC light boards.

Moving lights are much more difficult to program than their conventional cousins because they have more attributes per fixture that must be controlled. A simple conventional lighting fixture uses only one channel of control per unit: intensity. Everything else that the light must do is pre-set by human hands (colour, position, focus, etc.) An automated lighting fixture can have as many as 30 of these control channels. A slew of products are available on the market to allow operators and programmers to easily control all of these channels on multiple fixtures. Lighting boards are still the most common control mechanism, but many programmers use computer software to do the job. Software is now available that provides a rendered preview of the output produced by the rig once fixtures are connected to the program or console. This allows programmers to work on their show before ever entering the theater and know what to expect when the lights are connected to their controller. These products usually feature some method of converting a computer's USB output to a DMX output.

== Construction ==
Intelligent fixtures usually employ compact arc lamps as light sources. They use servo motors or, more commonly, stepper motors connected to mechanical and optical internal devices to manipulate the light before it emerges from the fixture's front lens. Examples of such internal devices are:

- Mechanical dimming shutters used to vary the intensity of the light output. Mechanical dimmers are usually a specially designed disk or a mechanical shutter. Shutters with high speed stepper motors can be used to create strobe effects.
- Color wheels with dichroic color filters used to change the color of the beam.
- Variable, incremental cyan, magenta and yellow color-mixing filters to vary beam color via subtractive color mixing. Using this method, a much wider range of colors can be created than is possible using single color filters.
- Automated lens trains used to zoom and focus the beam; irises are used to change the size of the beam. Some fixtures have as many as 10 independently controlled prisms and lenses to focus and shape the beam.
- Pattern wheels with gobos and gate shutters to change the shape of the beam or project images. Some fixtures have motors to rotate the gobo in its housing to create spinning effects, or use their complicated lens systems to achieve the same effect.
- Automated framing shutters to further shape the beam and control unwanted spill.

These fixtures also use motors to enable physical movement of the light beam by either:

- Pivoting an automated mirror which reflects the beam along x & y axes, or
- Attaching the entire fixture lens train to a yoke with motorized pan & tilt

Note that fixtures which use the former method are not technically “moving heads”, since the light source itself does not move. However, the term “moving head” is used interchangeably throughout this article. On a moving head the glass gobos could have some fault caused by back-reflections of the light on the lens; to solve this defect, anti-reflection gobos may be used.

== Usage ==
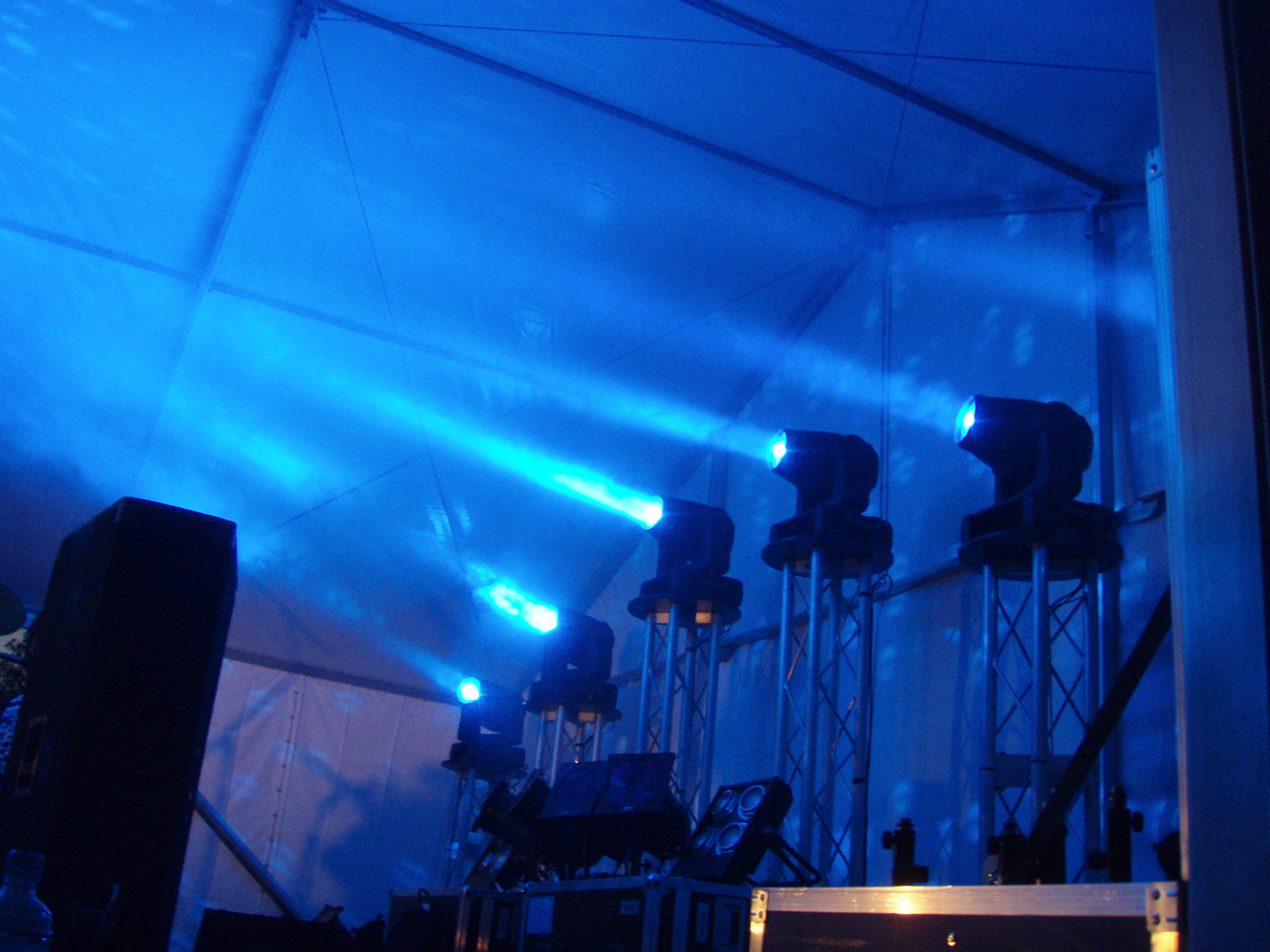
Six moving yokes lighting up a mirror ball

Intelligent lights (now commonly referred to as automated or moving heads), can be used wherever there is a need for powerful lighting which must be capable of rapid and extreme changes of mood and effects. Moving heads would, therefore, be inappropriate in a setting which does not require strong lighting (such as a home) or where the “quality” of the light required does not vary excessively (although it may need to be very strong for a venue like a stadium). Naturally, there are exceptions to this rule, most notably the use of large numbers of moving heads for international sporting events, such as the Commonwealth Games or Olympic Games, where many thousands of separate automated fixtures are often used to light the opening and closing ceremonies. The 2008 Summer Olympics, in Beijing, had a rig of around 2,300 intelligent fixtures which is "the largest single automated lighting system ever assembled for a single event"

Usually, however, the use of intelligent lights is confined to theatre, concerts, nightclubs, and churches where the versatility of these fixtures can be utilised to its best extent. In these applications, the uses of fixtures can be informally grouped into two categories: active and passive (although these are not standardised terms).

Passive use of automated lighting involves utilizing their versatility to perform tasks which would otherwise require many conventional lights to accomplish. For example, six to eight moving heads can create a textured blue “night” effect on the stage floor while applying amber light to the actors during one scene – this can create a sensation of dusk or night. At the flick of a switch, the fixture can change to an animated red “fire” effect for the next scene. Attempting this transition with traditional lighting fixtures could require as many as thirty instruments. In this circumstance, the automated fixtures are not doing anything that could not be achieved using conventional fixtures, but they dramatically reduce the number of lights needed in a rig. Other features of automated fixtures, such as rotating gobos, are also possible with conventional fixtures, but are much easier to produce with intelligent fixtures.

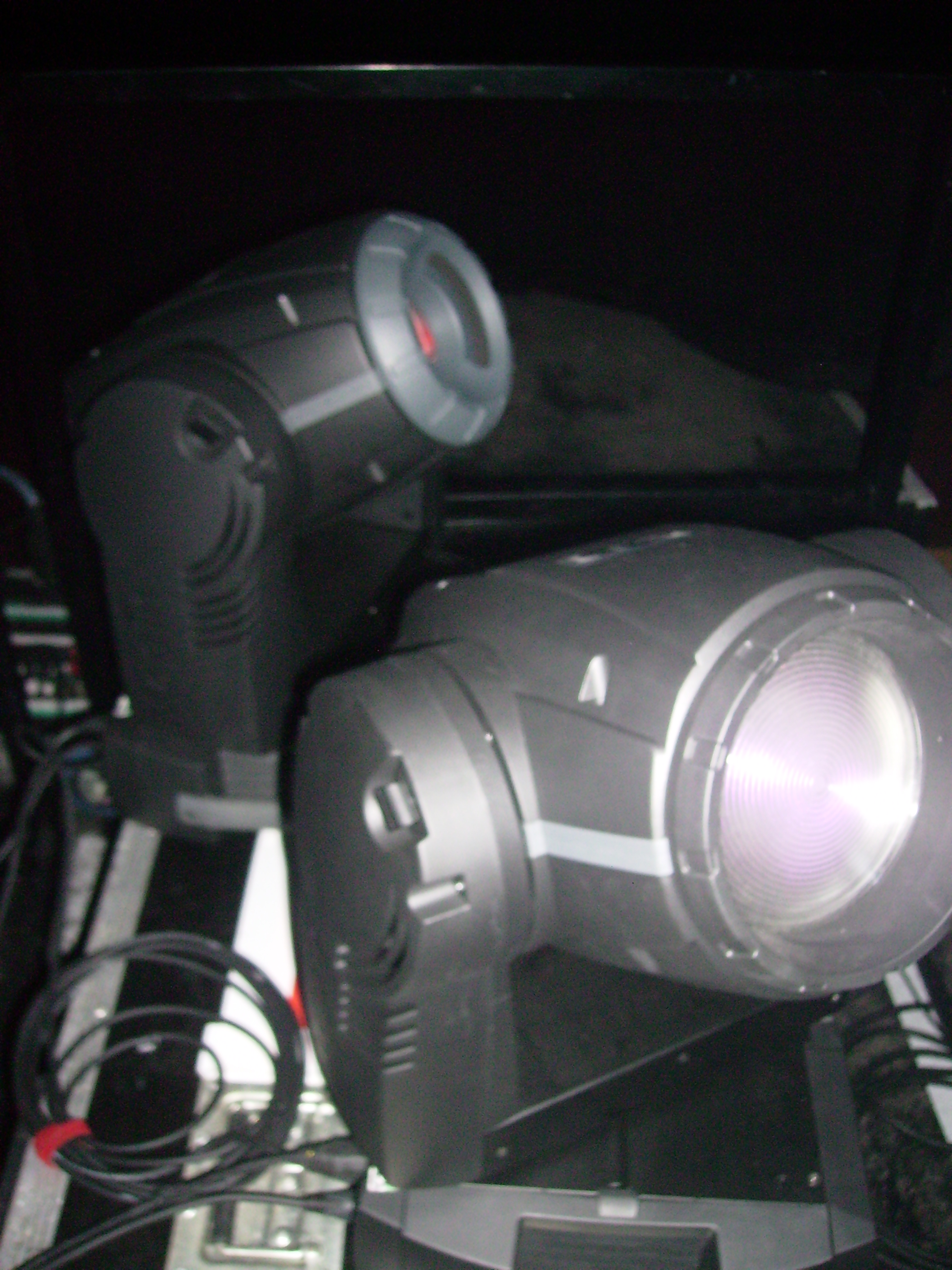
A Martin MAC 250 entour (profile – top) and MAC 250 wash (wash – bottom)

Active use of automated lights suggests that the luminaire is used to perform tasks which would otherwise require human involvement, or be simply impossible with conventional fixtures. For instance, a number of moving heads producing tightly focused, pure white beams straight down onto the stage will produce a fantastic effect reminiscent of searchlights from a helicopter (especially if a smoke machine or hazer is used to make the beams visible). To recreate such an effect without intelligent lights would require at least one human operator seated directly above the stage with a followspot, which would generally be considered to be too expensive for such a small effect.

Moving head fixtures are often divided into spot, wash lights and beam lights. They vary in use and functions, but many companies offer profile and wash versions of the same model of light. Profile lights generally contain features like gobos and prisms, whereas wash lights have simpler optics and a wider beam aperture resulting in wider beam angle, which may be altered by internal lenses or “frost effects”. Wash lights are more likely to have CMY colour mixing although it is common for high-end spot lights to have such features too. Spot units are generally used for their beam effect (usually through smoke or haze) and the ability to project texture, whereas wash lights tend to be used for providing a stage wash.

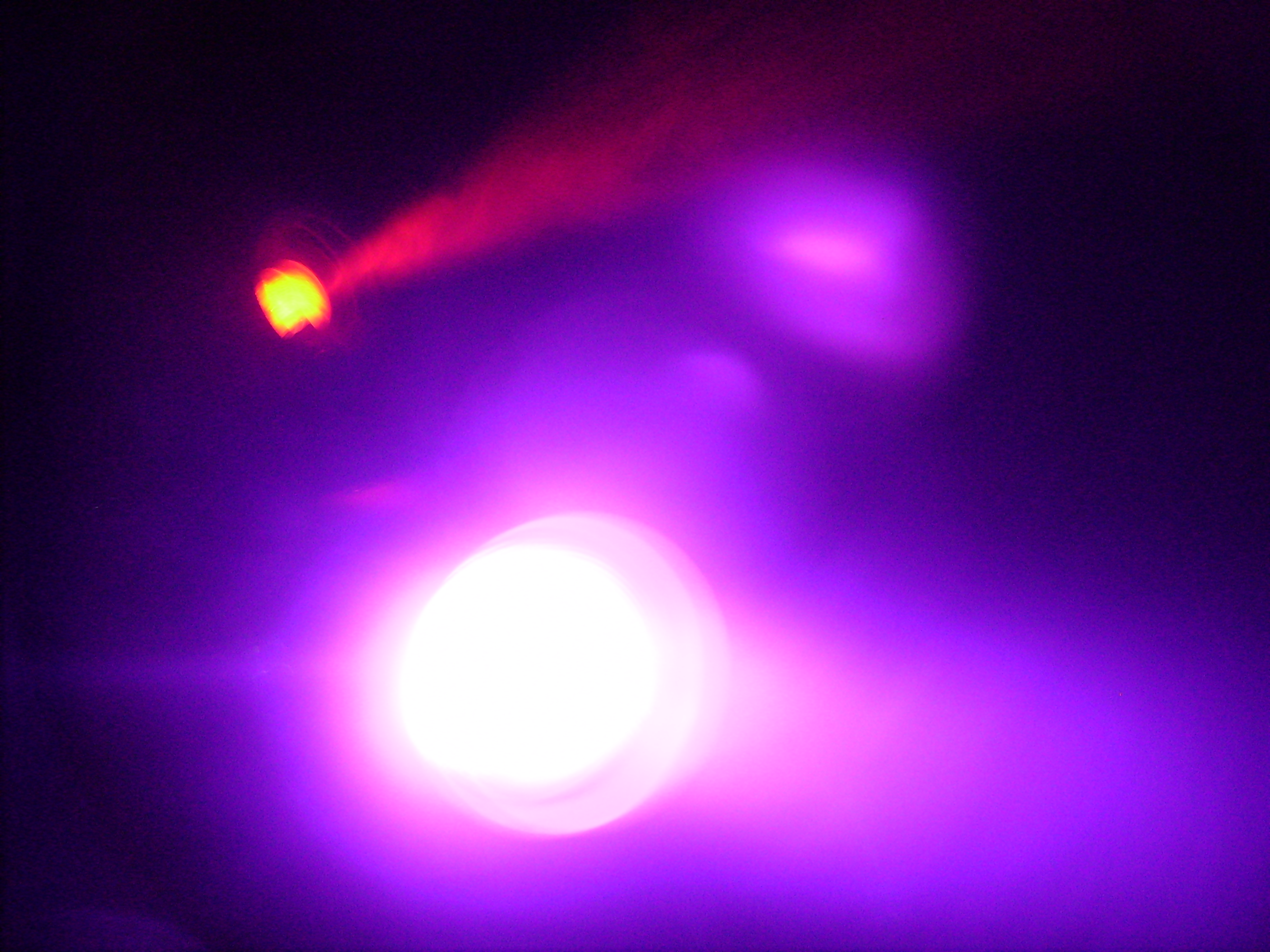
A Martin MAC 250 Entour (profile – top) and MAC 250 wash) wash – bottom). Notice the difference in beam characteristics caused by the gobo of the Entour and the wider beam angle of the wash.

Beam lights are often built much like the spot in terms of functionality aside from one key difference: beam lights use a wide lens to make an even more extreme beam. A typical spot has a beam angle from 15 to 35 degrees, whereas an average spot has a beam angle of three to seven degrees with some high end companies producing lights with zero degree beams. Such beam effects are less seen in the theatre industry and more in the club and concert industry.

== Debate ==
Not all lights that have movement can be defined as intelligent. Basic, low cost fixtures that are marketed primarily to DJ's, club venues, or for retail in novelty stores are not controllable beyond simply powering the device on or off. This lack of a feature set or remote control makes these lights only a small step above a conventional stage lighting instruments.

The introduction of devices referred to as "Auto-yokes", after the original design created by the company City Theatrical, blurs the line between a "conventional" and "intelligent" fixture. Designed to replace the static mounting hardware on stage lights, an automated yoke provides the pan and tilt features built into a traditional automated fixture. When combined with an LED fixture or colour scroller, the most common features of an automated light can be readily duplicated. "Auto-yokes" are often promoted as a way to modernize and increase the flexibility of an inventory of lighting fixtures at a reduced cost to replacement with intelligent lights.

Generally, moving mirrors are faster at adjusting a lights position than moving head fixtures; however, moving-heads-style fixtures have a far larger total range of movement. The movement from mirror lights tends to be rectilinear, because the center of movement for both axes is usually in the same place (behind the centre of the mirror). Moving head fixtures have a much more concentric range of motion, owing to the separation of the axis of motion. Much smoother operation can be achieved through one axis of a moving head luminaire describing a circle (usually pan) and the other (tilt) changes the diameter of the circular movement.

In early luminaires a pseudo rotating gobo effect could be achieved by moving the tilt in line with the other axis and then moving the pan from end stop to end stop.

== See also ==
- Stage lighting instrument
