= Architecture for Control Networks =

Network protocols for control of entertainment technology equipment

- International standard: ANSI Standard E1.17-2006

Architecture for Control Networks (ACN) is a suite of network protocols for control of entertainment technology equipment, particularly as used in live performance or large-scale installations. For example, lighting, audio or special effects equipment. ACN is maintained by Entertainment Services and Technology Association and its first official release was ANSI Standard E1.17-2006 - Entertainment Technology - Architecture for Control Networks. The standard was subsequently revised and released as ANSI E1.17-2010.

ACN was initially designed to be layered on top of UDP/IP and therefore will run over most IP transports including standard, inexpensive Ethernet and 802.11 (Wi-Fi) networks.

== Protocol architecture ==
ACN defines a common protocol architecture, two major network protocols (SDT, DMP), a device description language (DDL) and a number of ‘E1.17 Profiles for Interoperability’ (known as EPIs or interoperability profiles) which define how elements of the ACN architecture must be used in a particular context to achieve interoperability. For example, by providing specific values or ranges for timing parameters to be used in a particular network environment.

The breakdown of ACN into sub-protocols, interoperability profiles and other small pieces has been criticized as making ACN hard to read and understand but it makes the architecture highly modular and cleanly layered and this has allowed many of the pieces to be operated in other contexts or replaced or revised without changing the other pieces. For example, DMP has been operated over TCP as well as over SDT as defined in the initial standard, DDL has been adapted with little change to describe devices accessed by DMX512 (ANSI E1.31/Streaming ACN), and several interoperability profiles have seen major revision or replacement without disturbing the other parts of the standard.

=== Common Architecture ===
The common architecture specification defines a format of nested protocol data units (PDUs), rather similar to TLV encoding, which are used in the main protocols. It then defines how a minimal Root Layer Protocol is used to splice the higher level protocols into a lower level transport and defines such a Root Layer Protocol using the PDU format for use on UDP/IP.

=== Session Data Transport ===
Session Data Transport (SDT) is a reliable multicast transport protocol which operates over UDP/IP which can be used to group peers within a network into sessions and deliver messages to them individually or as a group. Message delivery is ordered and messages may be selectively sent reliably or unreliably on a message-by-message basis (reliability is very important for some data while avoiding the time and resource overhead of the reliability mechanism is beneficial for others). The reliability mechanism also provides online status so a component will detect when a connection is broken. SDT provides a high degree of fine tuning over the trade-off between latency, reliability levels and resource requirements and availability of large numbers of concurrent sessions means they are a powerful tool for grouping and managing components whose functions are related or whose communication requirements are similar.

=== Device Management Protocol ===
Device Management Protocol (DMP) represents any device as a set of addressable properties which represent its current or desired state. Monitoring or control by a controller is achieved by setting or examining the values of those properties. To avoid the inefficiencies of polling, in addition to simply reading property values (using a Get-Property message) DMP provides a subscription mechanism whereby a device will asynchronously send event messages to all subscribed controllers when the value of a property changes.

DMP expects that its connections can provide reliability so that Set-Property and Event messages which form a large part of the operational bandwidth in a show situation do not require explicit acknowledgement at the DMP level. In the E1.17 standard and the majority of systems SDT provides this reliability but DMP has also been operated using TCP to provide its reliable connections.

The size in bits, representation, read/write accessibility and function of each property in a DMP device is not determined by the protocol which only defines the mechanism to read and/or write the property value. Instead, that information must either be provided externally by a device description written in DDL or in limited cases may be pre-programmed by fore-knowledge of specific device types.

=== Device Description Language ===
Device Description Language (DDL) allows a machine parsable description of the interface and capabilities of any device to be defined. This description can be interpreted by a controller which may then automatically configure itself for controlling that device. The description not only provides the address and property mapping information which is necessary for DMP to operate but it can also contain a huge amount of information on the functionality, capabilities and semantics of the device in an extensible format which allows a controller to extract the features it needs for its specific context while skipping over information which is not relevant to its needs.

DDL is an XML based language and descriptions are contained in a small number of XML documents. In normal ACN systems the description for a device may be downloaded from the device itself. However, descriptions may also be distributed in other ways (such as internet download) and since a description is valid for all devices of the same type, controllers can typically maintain a cache of descriptions for devices they commonly encounter.

=== Interoperability profiles ===
Interoperability profiles (EPIs) are provided in ANSI E1.17 for initial service discovery in a system; for allocation of multicast addresses when used on UDP and IPv4; for UDP port allocation when multicasting, for IP address assignment in conformant systems, for protocol timeouts in specific environments and so on. Other EPIs which conform to the ACN Architecture have been developed outside the ANSI E1.17 standard (see below).

== External extensions ==
Due to its modular nature ACN has been easy to extend.

A major protocol ANSI E1.31 known as Streaming ACN or sACN was developed by the same organization and uses the Root Layer and PDU format of ACN to transport the data of DMX512 data over IP networks (or any other ACN compatible transport).

A number of further Interoperability Profiles have been developed and standardized by PLASA. These include:

ANSI E1.30-3-2009 Time Reference in ACN Systems Using SNTP and NTP ANSI E1.30-4-2010 which defines how to use DDL to describe devices controlled using DMX512 or Streaming ACN

== Implementations ==
An early open-source implementation of ACN was released as OpenACN and is available on SourceForge. This has been ported to a wide range of platforms, but it is limited in its scope and does not implement any DDL support.

There is another open source ACN project which is implemented in C#. This aims to provide a full managed code implementation and includes code for several other related protocols.

An full implementation entitled Acacian in C, which includes parsing of DDL descriptions to generate DMP structures was released under the Mozilla Public Licence in 2014

E1.31 (Streaming DMX over ACN) is supported on Linux (ARM, i386, x86-64) and Macintosh (PowerPC; i386, x86-64) by the Open Lighting Architecture.

A Rust implementation of E1.31 can be found on GitHub.

ACN has been deployed in proprietary implementations by a number of companies, including its use by Electronic Theatre Controls (ETC) as the basis of their 'NET3' branded networked control infrastructure and by Shure Inc. in control of wireless microphones.

== See also ==
- Lighting control systems for buildings or residences
- Lighting control consoles for stage lighting and other DMX-512 devices
- Art-Net, a proprietary protocol for transmitting DMX-512 over UDP/IP
- Open Control Architecture for control and monitoring of networked audio and video devices
