= Nautilus Entertainment Design =

California-based theatre consulting and lighting design firm

Nautilus Entertainment Design (NED) is a San Diego, California based theatre consulting and lighting design firm. NED was formed by lighting designer, Jim Tetlow in 1990. The firm handles the lighting design for over 40 shows a year which include television specials, corporate shows & meetings, Vegas style shows and spectacles. NED is best known for their theatre consulting work in the cruise ship industry providing design and consulting services for over fifty-five cruise ships with each containing multiple entertainment facilities for showrooms, lounges, and dance clubs. NED also provides architectural lighting design services on many of these ships.

Jim Tetlow is a member of the American Society of Theatre Consultants, ASTC, a professional organization.

== History ==
After viewing a show that Tetlow designed in Las Vegas in 1991, an executive from Carnival Cruise Lines hired him to light their shows on board a new ship, Carnival Sensation. Lighting design on further ships followed and in 1994 Tetlow was asked to consult on the entertainment facilities for Carnival Destiny, the first cruise ship in excess of 100,000 tons. Following that success, the fledgling company quickly expanded as they were called upon to now design all the new entertainment systems for most of the Carnival brands that includes Carnival Cruise Line, Costa Crociere, Holland America, Seabourn, and Cunard. As of 2008, NED has provided theatre consulting & design services for over 55 ships including the largest ocean liner in the world, the RMS Queen Mary 2.

== Cruise ship entertainment system design ==
Included in their consulting services for the 55 theatres, 71 lounges & bars and 22 dance clubs, they have been responsible for the design and commissioning of the lighting, audio, video, large screen projection, special effects and stage mechanical systems for all the showrooms, lounges and discos/dance clubs as well as consulting on the broadcast television systems and architectural lighting systems for the atriums, restaurants and other public spaces. They were also responsible for the design of the jumbo 270-sq. ft. LED video walls that have been installed in Carnival's various ships called the "Seaside Theatre."

== Lighting design ==
Besides their extensive work for the cruise lines, NED has also designed new lighting systems for the Architect of the Capitol including feasibility designs for the United States Senate and House of Representatives chambers in Washington, D.C.

Additional architectural lighting design projects include both the interior and exterior lighting of the Silver Star Hotel & Casino in Philadelphia, Missouri, special architectural feature lighting on board the Holland America ship MS Rotterdam; and the Fountain of Angels in Carthage, Missouri.

Special Event lighting design includes the Hong Kong Handover Ceremony to China (Transfer of sovereignty over Hong Kong), the Macau Handover Ceremony to China (Transfer of sovereignty over Macau) & Singapore’s 25th Jubilee Spectacular. They were responsible for lighting the 2000, 2004 through 2016 United States presidential election debates as well as the vice-presidential election debates.

Corporate clients for which NED provided lighting design services for shows, events and exhibits include: Chrysler, GM, Hewlett Packard, IBM, Infiniti, Intel, Jeep, McDonald's, Nissan, Porsche, Toyota and Wal-Mart.
