= Jim Tetlow =

American theatre consultant (born 1955)

William James Tetlow (born August 21, 1955), is a theatre consultant, television and theatrical lighting designer based in San Diego, California. He has been the recipient of an Emmy Award, won in 1990 for Sesame Street, and two other nominations. He has been referred to as the guru of entertainment systems design for his work on over 55 ships for various brands of the Carnival Corporation cruise ship fleet.

== Biography ==
Tetlow was born in 1955. He graduated from Lakewood (Ohio) High School in 1973 and later studied at Carnegie Mellon with a BFA in Drama, which he graduated in 1977. After working for several years as a free-lance lighting designer, he was hired in 1981 by the renowned Imero Fiorentino Associates (IFA) in New York City. During his ten years at IFA he worked primarily in television including designing the lighting for specials for all of the major television networks. He also designed lighting for corporate projects and exhibits including the Spruce Goose airplane exhibit in Long Beach, California. and the AT&T exhibit at Epcot at Walt Disney World.

In 1990, he left IFA and formed his own company, The Tetlow Company Inc., which provided lighting design for television, live shows, and special events. After expanding into the design of entertainment facilities, the name was changed to Nautilus Entertainment Design in 2000.

Tetlow is a member of the LHS Distinguished Alumni Hall of Fame and is the recipient of a Carnegie-Mellon Alumni Achievement Award in 2014.

== Associations ==
He is a member of the American Society of Theatre Consultants, the Academy of Television Arts and Sciences, International Photographers Guild#659, and The Illuminating Engineering Society.

== Awards ==
His awards include a 1990 Emmy Award for the lighting of Sesame Street; a 1987 Monitor Award for Courting, an original studio drama; and a 1985 Monitor Award for a music video with Jim Henson's Muppets. Additionally, he has received two other Emmy Award nominations and three other Monitor Award Nominations.

== Credits ==
=== Theatre consultant ===
In his capacity of President of Nautilus Entertainment Design, Tetlow has consulted on the theatres, lounges, and dance clubs for over 55 of the Carnival Cruise Lines ships, as well as for land based projects. Included in his responsibilities are the conceptual designs for all audio and communications systems, show lighting systems, automated rigging and mechanical equipment including full-height fly lofts and integrated control systems in each ship's showroom. Ships that have been part of the consulting services have include RMS Queen Mary, the largest of the Cunard Fleet, P&O Cruises' Ventura, the largest cruise ship built for Britain, and Carnival Splendor, the largest of all the Carnival Cruise Lines' ships.

=== Lighting design and direction ===
Live television credits include the 1992 Democratic National Convention; the 1984, 1988 and 1996 Republican National Conventions, the Daytime Emmy Awards, the NBC Olympic Broadcast Center Olympics on NBC in Barcelona, Spain, the Miss America Pageant and seven years of the Miss Universe Pageant from locations around the world. Other television credits include such diverse productions as The Tonight Show; Sesame Street at the Metropolitan Museum of Art; the Radio City Christmas Spectacular; Life Magazine's 50th Anniversary Special; and the world premiere of Andrew Lloyd Webber's Requiem, for the BBC and several Barbara Walters specials.

Live special events include the Hong Kong Handover Ceremony (Transfer of sovereignty over Hong Kong) and the Macau Handover Ceremonies (Transfer of sovereignty over Macau), numerous Presidential Inaugural Balls, the 2000, 2004, 2008 and 2012, and 2016 United States presidential election debates, the World University Games and the Singapore 25th Jubilee Spectacular”.

Tetlow has also worked extensively as a lighting designer on corporate videos and live theatrical productions for such clients as General Motors, Hewlett-Packard, Daimler-Chrysler, Mercedes-Benz, Nissan, Porsche, Michelin, Polaroid, IBM, and an interactive live/video presentation with Mummenschanz for AT&T.

In Las Vegas, he has designed the lighting for "Night Dreams" at the Dunes Hotel, relighting of selected scenes in the “Folies Bergere”, and the 10-year run of "Enter the Night" at the Stardust Hotel. Similar projects include the production of “Beyond Belief” in Sun City, South Africa, and numerous productions onboard various ships for Carnival Cruise Lines.

Exhibit lighting designs include the entire General Motors exhibit at the 2007 through 2019 Detroit Auto Shows or NAIAS as well as numerous press events, Hewlett Packard exhibits at CES and at ITU, IBM and Apple exhibits at COMDEX, an AT&T exhibit at Epcot, and temporary exhibits for Porsche, Universal Pictures and Sony HDTV.

=== Production facility lighting ===
In 1993 and 1994, Tetlow consulted for Singapore Broadcasting Corporation, providing lighting training and design services for new studios and upgrading current facilities. For the United States Capitol, projects include feasibility studies for the redesign of both the architectural and television lighting of the United States Senate Chamber and the United States House of Representatives Chamber, and lighting consultation for the restoration and video upgrade for two Senate Hearing Rooms and numerous House of Representatives Hearing Rooms.

=== Architectural lighting ===
Architectural lighting design projects include both the interior and exterior lighting of the Silver Star Hotel & Casino in Philadelphia, Missouri, numerous other Native American casinos, and seven cruise ships for Carnival, Holland American and Seabourn.
