= Frederick Bentham =

British Lighting Designer and Engineer (1911–2001)

Frederick Percy Bentham
- Born: 23 October 1911; Harlesden
- Died: 10 May 2001 (aged 89)
- Other names: Fred
- Occupations: Lighting designer Lighting engineer
- Known for: Light Console; Theatre Lighting; Strand Pattern 23 spot light Strand Pattern 264 spotlight

Frederick Bentham FABTT FIES (23 October 1911 – 10 May 2001) was a British theatre lighting designer and engineer who created the Light Console in 1932 and continued to influence lighting in theatres into the 1970s, firstly as the chief engineer before becoming the Research and Design director of Strand Electric and Engineering Company. Bentham would go on to become the editor of TABS, Strand's technical journal, and Sightline, the ABTT's journal, as well as an author specialising in writing on the subjects of theatres and lighting. In 1969 he was elected as master of the Art Workers Guild.

== Early life ==
Bentham was born on 23 October 1911 in Harlesden, to the sculpturer Percy George Bentham and his wife Ellen Celia Hobbs and had two siblings, Philip (also a sculpturer, best known for The Coventry Boy) and Celia. Bentham was a muse for his father at just 7 months old, with a sculpture of him created in bronze. While at school, Bentham started his love affair with lighting by working in the amateur theatre club and by creating mock up design for theatre lighting by using Meccano. His great grandfather was the British philosopher Jeremy Bentham.

== Career ==
Bentham started his career with General Electric Company in 1929. He was part of the theatre consulting engineers department, where he was assistant to Basil Davis in what was a two man department. The work was mainly concentrated on decorative lighting of movie theatres, which grew his interest in colour mixing and brought to his attention the electro-mechanical Mansell clutch.

In 1932, Bentham joined Strand Electric and Engineering Company to manage both their demonstration theatre and their showroom. Strand Lighting was the leading brand in the British theatres and Bentham would go onto make his mark. It was in 1932 that he developed the first Light Console prototype, probably the first remote control for theatre lighting to be run one person, based on a Compton organ. He wrote about his idea in his article Light as an Art in The Builder. Previous to the Light Console, a complex mechanical device was used and the operators were unable to see the stage. The console used the Mansell clutch, which allowed remote control of dimmers from an electro-mechanically driven shaft. The Light Console could be located where a single operator could actually see what was being lit. His first prototype was used by Bentham to perform a colour light show at the Ideal Home Exhibition in 1932. He would continue to give demonstrations of what he called Colour Music. Bentham's early work included working as consultant, which in 1933 he worked at The Questors Theatre, in Ealing and John Christie at Glyndebourne.

By 1936, he had exerted his influence on the company by introducing a new case-bound catalogue which included many innovative products designed by Bentham, including profile spotlights, parallel beamlights, and acting area spotlights. The catalogue also included models that only had an existence in its pages but could be built if required. He was elected to the Art Workers Guild as a Decorative Colour Worker member in 1936 after his lecture Stage Lighting as an Art at the Guild, in front of his father and George Bernard Shaw. However Bentham fell ill this year contracting Tuberculosis, which he would require major surgery for 11 years later, and did not return to work full time until 1939. His father Percy would also die this year.

The first commercial sale of the Light Console was to the Teatro Nacional de São Carlos in Lisbon in 1940. Due to the war it took 6 months to complete the installation, with Bentham and Strand foreman Bill Pepworth having to get permission from the Portuguese ambassador to take seats on a weekly civil flight. Bentham also led the war work of Strand by developing lighting for aircraft carriers and helped to develop a torpedo attack teacher flight simulator for the Fleet Air Arm.

In 1947, Bentham had a "Kill or Cure" operation for Tuberculosis. It was during this recovery time he met his wife Ilse, a nurse at the sanatorium. The prognosis at the time was not good, and Ilse told her colleagues He's been given four or five years and we intend to be happy. It was during this time he wrote his first publication Stage Lighting. While on his road to recovery, Bentham acted as an unofficial adviser to the construction of the Royal Festival Hall and provided a Light Console, which not only controlled the 84 on stage lighting circuits but also the lighting for the auditorium.

While in the sanatorium, Strand asked one of Bentham's team, James Templeton Wood to develop an electronic system based on Thryatron valves that George Izenour had developed at Yale University. The Strand Remote Control – Electronic Type or known as the Woody was unfortunately unreliable, and by 1955 Bentham had returned the company back to motorised resistance and transformer dimmers.

During 1950, the biggest Light Console yet was designed by Bentham for the Theatre Royal, Drury Lane. In 1953, Bentham and Strand engineer Morgan McLeod designed the Strand Pattern 23 spot light, the first mass-produced spotlight and die cast in aluminium. McLeod and Bentham had met while working on the torpedo attack teacher flight simulator during the war.

It was during the 1950s through to the early 60s that Strand become the leading supplier to the growing UK television industry, with Bentham selling the concept of dimming and becoming a leading participant. In 1957, Bentham became the editor of TABS, Strand Lighting's own journal and would continued in the role until his departure in 1973. His editorship, plus his lectures at Strand's demonstration theatre gained him a wide following. In 1969, Bentham wrote in TABS that theatres should be Works of Art rather than machines. In 1958, Bentham was made a director of Strand.

In 1961, Bentham became a founding member of the Association of British Theatre Technicians and would become the organisations Vice Chairman, and then Chairman. It was in 1962 that Strand launched the Bentham designed Pattern 264 spotlight. The 264 was patented as a biofocal spotlight and the entire lens tube was mounted with a hinge to the lamphouse, so it could be swung open for access to the reflector or lens. The 264 became ubiquitous amongst British theatres and many lighting rigs had been designed around the spotlight, which caused a problem when they wanted to replace them years later. Bentham became a founding member of the Institute of Theatre Consultants when it was conceived in 1964. In 1966, Bentham's Research and Development team demonstrated the IDM (Instant Dimmer Memory), the first lighting memory system.

By 1968, Strand were falling behind the opposition and were heavily investing in solid state technology, which made them a target for a takeover. That arrived in the form of The Rank Organisation. The company was renamed Rank Strand, and they invested in Bentham's idea DDM (Digital Dimmer Memory), which made its first appearance in 1971 at the Royal Shakespeare Theatre in Stratford-upon-Avon. Bentham released his next publication Art of Stage Lighting in 1968, which would go onto have two further versions in 1976 and 1980. In 1970 he released a his next book, New Theatres in Britain and followed this with Stage Planning in 1971.

Bentham did not fit into the corporate culture at The Rank Organisation and retired from the business in 1973. He moved to become the editor of the Association of British Theatre Technicians journal, Sightline in 1974, a role held until 1984, and worked as a theatre consultant. Bentham released his autobiography Sixty Years of Light Work in 1992.

== Awards ==
In 1969 Bentham was elected as the master of the Art Workers' Guild. Bentham was awarded an MBE for his services to the theatre and television in 1979 but he refused to accept it. In 1983 he was elected as the first fellow of the Association of British Theatre Technicians. In 1997, Bentham received The Wally Russell Award for Outstanding Lifetime Achievement in Entertainment Technology.

== Personal life and death ==
Bentham was married to Ilse, and had two sons, Freddy and Jeremy. He died in London on 10 May 2001. His funeral was held at the Mortlake Crematorium in Richmond on Thames on 24 May 2001 and a memorial service was held at the London Palladium in June 2001.
