= Electronic Theatre Controls =

Lighting and rigging company

Electronic Theatre Controls (ETC)
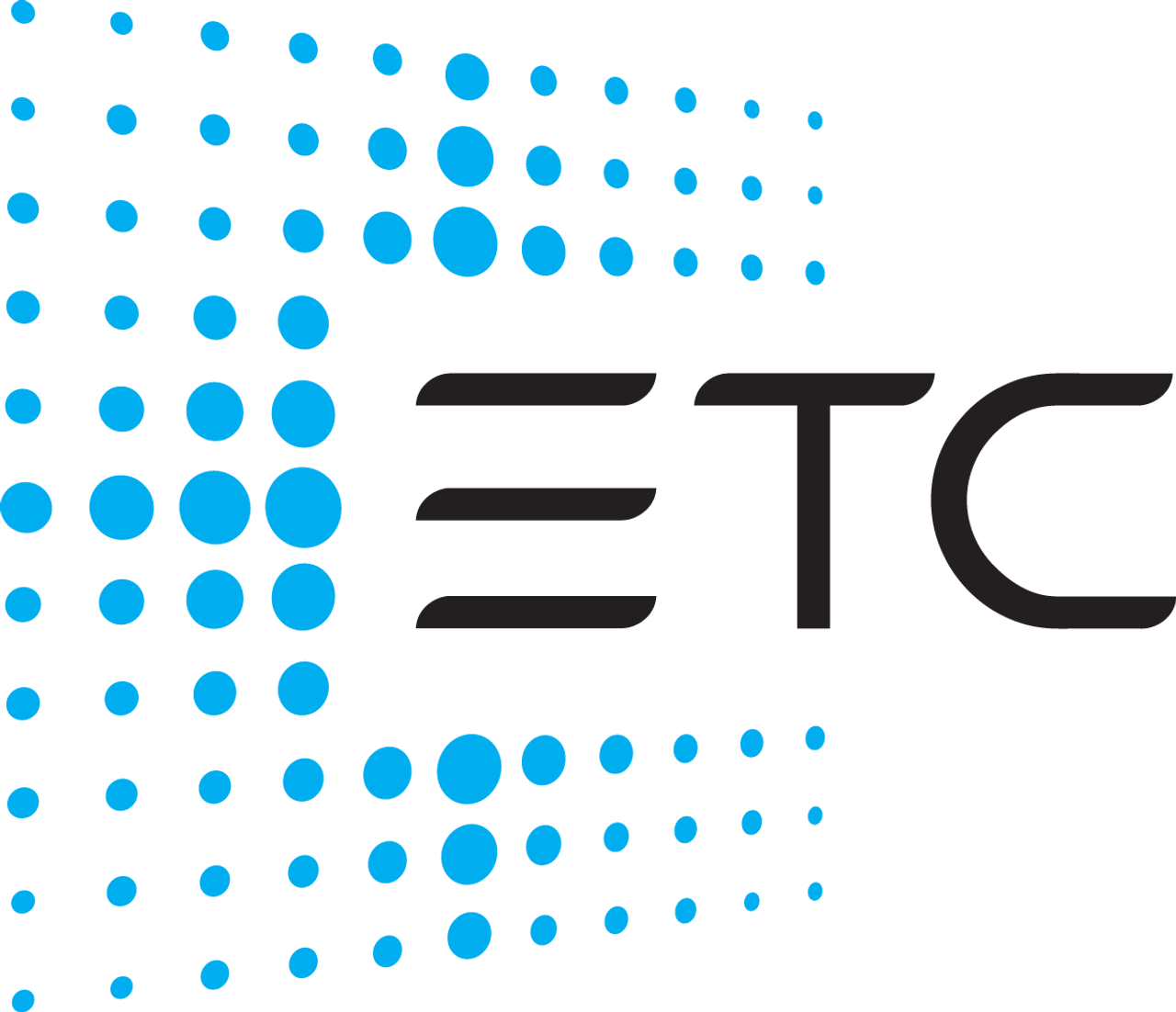
- Type: Private
- Industry: Live Entertainment
- Founded: 1975
- Founder: Fred Foster, Bill Foster, James Bradley, Gary Bewick
- Headquarters: Middleton, Wisconsin
- Products: Source Four Fixtures; ColorSource Fixtures; Eos Console Systems; Prodigy Rigging Systems
- Owner: Employee Owned (Since 2015)
- Website: etcconnect.com

Electronic Theatre Controls (ETC) is a manufacturer of live event technology based in Middleton, Wisconsin. Starting in the entertainment industry with a custom lighting control console in 1975, ETC has since expanded into power controls, rigging, luminaires, architectural and commercial installations, and horticultural lighting. ETC serves markets such as performance venues, museums, building exteriors, stadiums, and houses of worship. ETC has won awards for its products, innovation, and company culture, including awards from Live Design and the Professional Lighting and Sound Association. Their products include several lines of lighting fixtures, Eos lighting controllers, and Paradigm architectural control systems. Notably, ETC is known for the development and manufacturing of Source Four lighting fixtures.

== History ==
In 1975, University of Wisconsin-Madison students Fred Foster, Bill Foster, Gary Bewick, and James Bradley announced their goal of creating a theatrical lighting control system. The four friends set to work in the Fosters' home, creating what would eventually be known as the Mega Cue console. For the first several years in business, their consoles were sold exclusively to Berkey ColorTran, who then sold them under their company name.

By 1982, ETC launched its first branded console called the Concept, which Disney used to light their parade routes. Around this time, ETC also began working closely with the dimming system manufacturer Lighting Methods, Inc (LMI). ETC acquired LMI in 1990.

The Source Four, an ellipsoidal reflector spotlight, was announced at the Live Design International trade show in 1992. It was widely adopted and as of 2012 has sold over 3 million units.

In 1995, ETC opened its first international office, ETC Asia, in Hong Kong. Following this, the company expanded further, opening offices in Denmark (1997), Rome (1999), and Germany (2002). In 1998, ETC acquired Vari-Lite Inc.'s architectural lighting company, Irideon.

The lighting industry began a shift to LED technology, which led to ETC's acquisition in 2009 of Selador. In 2014, ETC purchased the Vortek rigging division of New York-based Daktronics and began to offer rigging solutions internationally a year later. ETC continued its expansion into new markets as the company bought the automated lighting company High End Systems in April 2017 from Barco, Inc.

ETC entered the horticultural lighting market when the company launched RAYN Growing Systems in 2019 to explore the effects of LEDs on plant growth. In February that year, Fred Foster, the founder and CEO of ETC, died at the age of 61 and Dick Titus stepped in as President/CEO.

ETC celebrated its 40th anniversary in 2015 and became one-third employee-owned. The company's employee stock option plan was expanded in the following years, with the company becoming 100 percent employee-owned in December 2023.

In 2026, James Foster, who has served on ETC's board of directors since 2022, was promoted to President of ETC.
