= Association of British Theatre Technicians =

British organisation

- Formation: 1961
- Type: Professional association
- Legal status: Charitable organisation
- Purpose: To raise technical standards in the theatre
- Headquarters: London, EC1; United Kingdom
- Revenue: From the ABTT Theatre Show, conferences, training and membership subscriptions
- Website: www.abtt.org.uk

The Association of British Theatre Technicians (ABTT) is a British charitable organisation representing technical staff working within theatre.

== Overview ==
The ABTT was founded in 1961 by group of theatre producers, technicians and architects. The association has played a key role in ensuring that regulations are suitably drafted and enforced, publishing a number of recommended Codes of Practice for the theatrical industry and theatrical technicians.

One of the ABTT's central aims is to "set out the physical standards for building and their equipment that are necessary to enable to good management of the premises and to provide the safety of the occupants in premises used for entertainment”. The ABTT supports individuals, Theatres, and Organisations by providing technical theatre related training, a technical helpline, and networking through industry events such as the ABTT Theatre Show. The ABTT is a Charitable Organization under English law, and operates throughout England, Wales, Northern Ireland and Scotland. The ABTT also has a number of volunteer technical committees which liaise with government and other organisations.

== Membership ==
The ABTT employs a small staff team led by CEO Robin Townley. The ABTT is governed by Memorandum and Articles of Association and is registered as a charitable organisation with the Charity Commission for England and Wales. It has 11 trustees who are appointed due to their expertise in areas including theatre and stage management, architecture, technical theatre, planning law and the performing arts.

The ABTT's funding is derived from its memberships, donations given by supporters and proceeds from training. The principal source of income is from events including the ABTT Theatre Show which is held annually.

In 1983, Frederick Bentham was elected as the first fellow of the Association. Bentham was a founding member of the Association and would take on the roles of Vice Chairman and later Chairman, while he was editor of Sightline, the Association's journal from 1974 to 1984.

== Remit ==
The ABTT was established by in 1961 with a central focus of ensuring "the advancement of …the technical subjects connected with theatre and theatrical presentation, fostering knowledge and the appreciation of the art of technical theatre".

The ABTT offers guidance and advice through their Codes of Practice relating to planning, health and safety, architecture regeneration and development, and design which concern theatres and places of entertainment. The ABTT's remit covers a large range of buildings which include both old and new theatres either used, disused or in other uses. Notably, it also includes buildings or structures that have been temporarily converted into theatrical spaces.

== ABTT Theatre Show ==
ABTT Theatre Show
- Status: Active
- Genre: Entertainments Industry Technical Equipment
- Venue: Alexandra Palace, London
- Location: London
- Country: United Kingdom
- Inaugurated: 1977
- Founder: Association of British Theatre Technicians
- Attendance: 2500+
- Organizer: ABTT
- Website: www.abtttheatreshow.org.uk

The ABTT Theatre Show is an annual trade show hosted in London and organised by registered charity, the Association of British Theatre Technicians. The ABTT Theatre show draws exhibitors and visitors from all over the world interested in topics such as lighting, audio visual, scenography, rigging, set construction, technical theatre and related technologies.

=== History ===
The ABTT Theatre show has been running since 1978, originally named The ABTT Trade show but rebranded in 2001.

From 1980 the event was situated in the Shaftesbury Theatre; proceeding in 1981–82 to The Roundhouse and Riverside Studios during 1984–90.

The ABTT then moved the Theatre Show to The Old Truman Brewery in Shoreditch after deciding that an event space, rather than an exhibition hall would "provide everything we need to use… (with it being ) a quirky venue… exhibitors have welcomed the choice." and since then Alexandra Palace has held the event from 2015 to present.

Due to the coronavirus outbreak, the 42nd ABTT Theatre Show scheduled for June 2020 was postponed, being run instead in collaboration with PLASA in 2021 from 5–7 September at Olympia London. In 2022 the ABTT Theatre Show was handed over to ABTT Association and Event Manager Elysia Moore, who has overseen the growth of the event with more exhibitors and attendees than in previous years and the addition of hands on workshops and a Careers and Professional Development Hub to support new entrants to the Industry.

=== Remit ===
The purpose of the ABTT Theatre Show is to bring together drama schools, Trade Associations and live entertainment under one roof to help explore the connection between these different Industries.

The ABTT Theatre Show has been developed by the ABTT to be relevant across theatre, TV, film and commercial work. A broad range of technical disciplines are covered, bring relevant to venue operators, production staff, theatre consultants and students addressing issues of health and safety, codes of practice, live performance, academic development, and other relevant matters.

Exhibitor Technology, Live performance and specialist advice is made available for a wide range of issues which relate to theatres and places of entertainment. These include theatre design, sound design, stage lighting, live performance, and issues relating to health and safety issues matters that relate to places of entertainment.

=== ABTT Awards ===
Each year the ABTT Theatre show presents the ABTT Awards on the evening of the first day. These include "the ‘ABTT Technician of the Year Award’ which recognises the contributions of seasoned individuals in backstage roles who consistently demonstrate technical excellence; the ‘ABTT Award for Emerging Excellence’ which celebrates the achievements of newcomers in any backstage role or discipline; and the ‘ABTT Award for Environmental Sustainability’ which acknowledges a significant contribution by an individual to furthering environmental sustainability within the theatre industry." New for 2024 is the ABTT Award for Costume and ABTT Award for WHAM Design which aim to honour the expertise and significant contributions of industry professionals, as well as the creative collaborations they foster within the production process.

In 2014, these awards were presented for the first time in combination with the National Awards for Stage Management in a joint ceremony with the Stage Management Association, with the host for the awards being actress Lesley Manville.

== Resources ==
The ABTT has a number of resources that contribute towards the promotion of health and safety within theatres and their technical equipment:

- Codes of Practice: The ABTT joined with the Health and Safety Executive (HSE) to contribute guidance on best practice within a variety of technical theatre fields.
- Technical Standard for Places of Entertainment – The ABTT is a contributor for this publication which was produced to offer advice of safe standards and good practice for all types of entertainment premises.
- Sightline: The ABTT publishes Sightline – Journal for Theatre Technology and Design quarterly. The ABTT also publishes health and safety, technical theatre books to guide users in best practice.
- Committees – The Trust maintains a number of committees that collaborate with organisations to further research technical and historical issues.
