= Martin De Prycker =

Belgian engineer and businessman (born 1955)

- Born: 16 January 1955 (age 71)
- Education: MSc in electrical engineering, PhD in computer sciences at Ghent University; MBA at the University of Antwerp
- Occupations: Engineer; Businessman

Martin De Prycker (b. Sint-Niklaas, 16 January 1955) is a Belgian engineer and businessman. He was until December 2008 the CEO of Barco, a Belgian display hardware manufacturer. He is CEO of Caliopa, a spin-off of Ghent University and IMEC and is managing partner at Qbic fund.

== Education ==
He graduated as a MSc in electrical engineering (1979) and holds a PhD in computer sciences (1982) from Ghent University. In addition, he obtained an MBA at the University of Antwerp in 1992.

== Career ==
He started his career at Alcatel in 1982, at that time ITT. During his career at Alcatel, he held various key positions in Alcatel's research center in Antwerp. In 1985, he started research on ATM, which resulted in a first world prototype in Telecom Geneva in 1991. In 1996, as head of the Access Business Unit, he led Alcatel's ADSL virtual company for the development of ADSL. In 2000, he became Chief Technology Officer (CTO) and a member of the executive committee of Alcatel in Paris. In February 2002, he became the CEO of Barco, where he succeeded Hugo Vandamme.

De Prycker was teaching at Boston University from 1988 to 1992 and at Ghent University from 1994 to 1999.

He is a member of the board of Agoria and of VOKA. He is a member of the committee Proces voor Prioriteitstelling inzake Technologie en Innovatie in Vlaanderen of the Flemish Council for Science Policy and of the board of advice of the GIMV.

== Bibliography ==
- Martin De Prycker, Asynchronous Transfer Mode: Solution for the Broadband ISDN, Prentice Hall PTR; 3Rev Ed edition (23 August 1995), ISBN 0-13-342171-6

== Sources ==
- Martin De Prycker wordt nieuwe CEO van BARCO (press release)
- Martin De Prycker wordt nieuwe CEO van BARCO (in Dutch)
