= Coombe Country Park =

Country park in Warwickshire, England

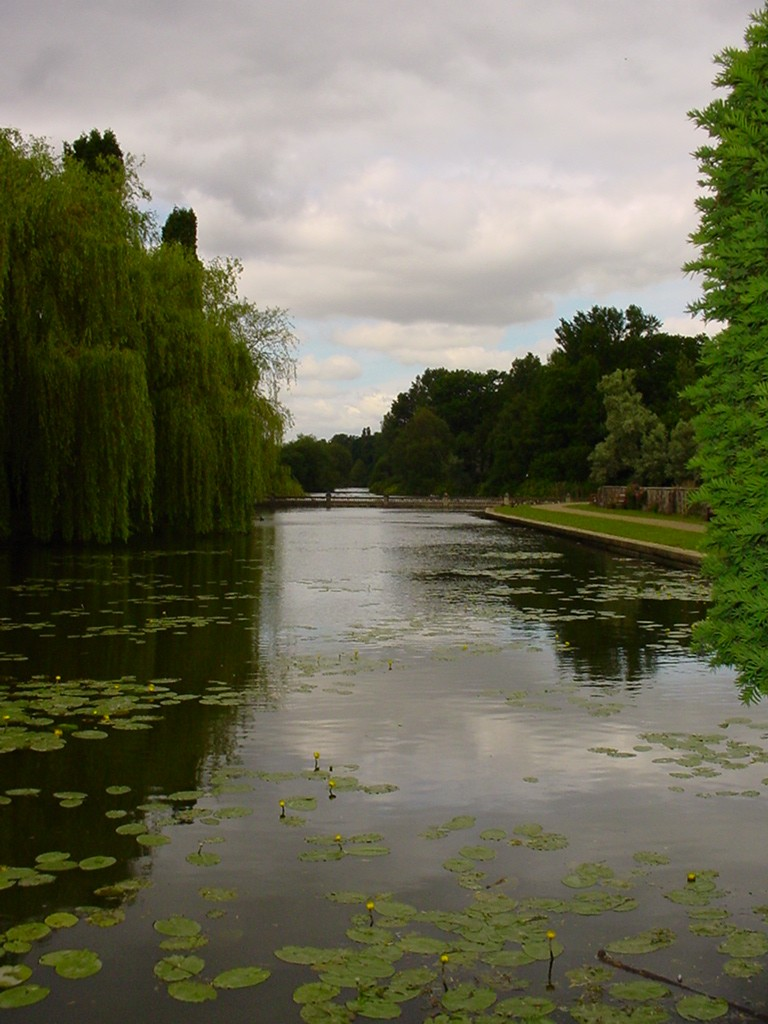
- The lake in Coombe Country Park
- Interactive map of Coombe Country Park
- Location: Combe Fields, Warwickshire, England
- Coordinates: 52.412°N 1.409°W

National Register of Historic Parks and Gardens
- Official name: Combe Abbey
- Type: Grade II*
- Designated: 1 February 1986
- Reference no.: 1000408

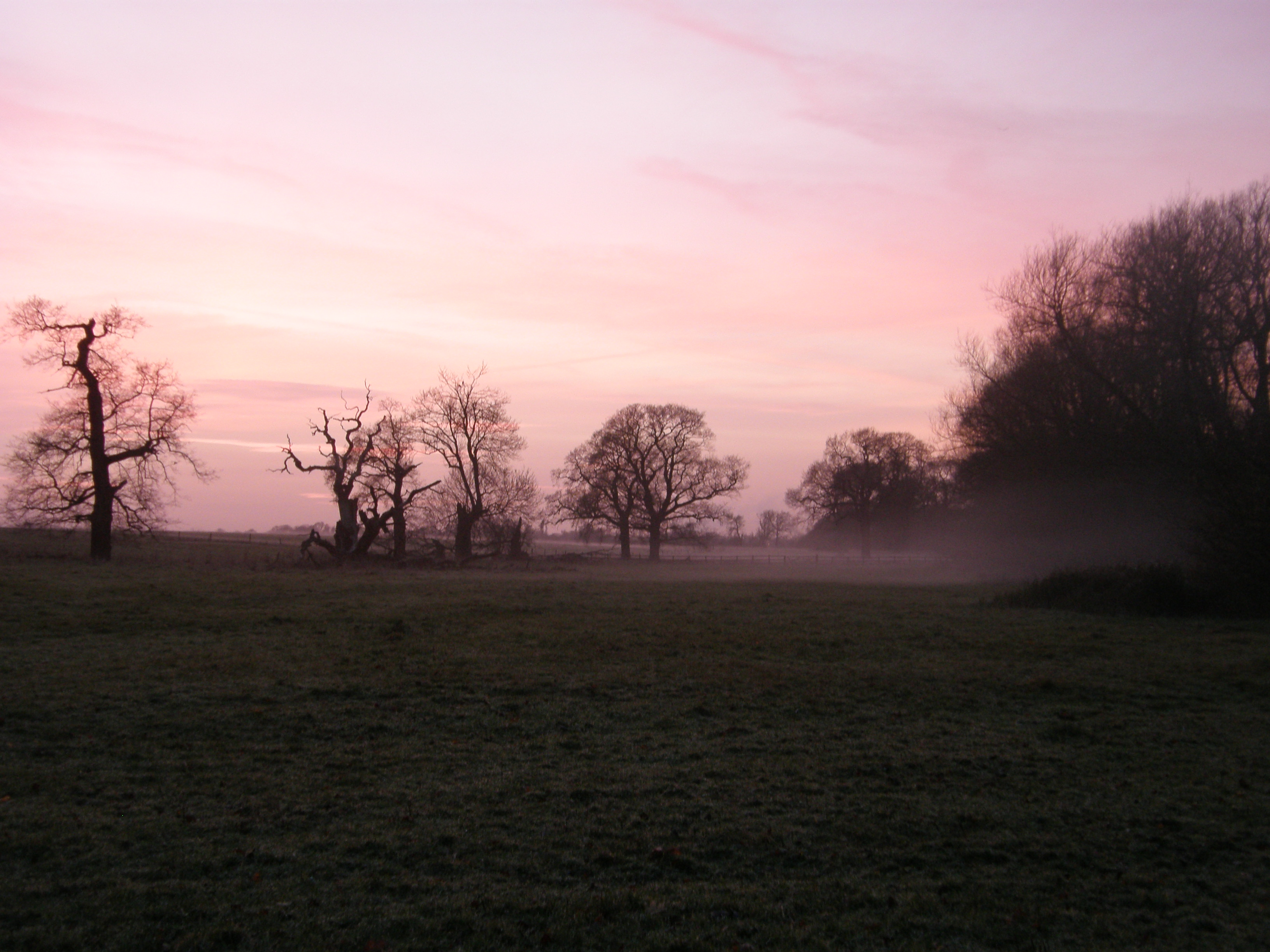
The Deer Park

Coombe Country Park is a country park located in Warwickshire, England. The park is only 4.5 miles (7.5 km) east of Coventry city centre and is managed by Coventry City Council. The park has been developed from the grounds of an old Cistercian abbey, the buildings of which have now been converted into the Coombe Abbey hotel.

In the 18th century the landscape of the park was designed by Capability Brown making it an historically important site for the region, however evidence dates back to occupation in the area to the Romans. The eldest daughter of James VI and I, Elizabeth Stuart, Queen of Bohemia was also educated at Coombe Abbey, and there are links to Guy Fawkes and the Gunpowder Plot.

The statue in the lake, 'Fisherman and Nymph', is by Percy George Bentham.

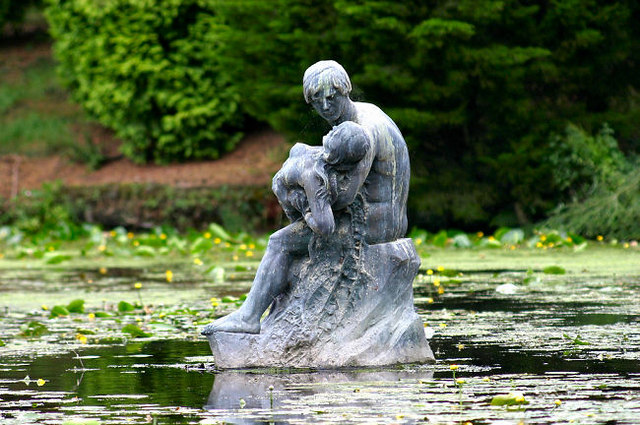
Fisherman and Nymph statue

The park now contains 500 acres (2.0 km^{2}) of woodlands, formal gardens, arboretum, open grasslands and lake. It has a visitor centre equipped with a Cafe, Gift shop, Crafty cat ceramics and Woodturners workshops. It also has a climbing forest, bird hide, summer wild flower meadow and an extensive events programme.
