= Strand Lighting =

Stage and television lighting company

- Type: Subsidiary
- Industry: Stage & Television Lighting
- Founded: 1914 (London)
- Headquarters: Dallas, Texas, United States
- Parent: Signify N.V.
- Website: http://www.strandlighting.com

Strand Lighting is an international theatre and television lighting company founded in 1914 in London's West End that supplies lighting fixtures and controls for the entertainment industry. Strand's products have been used on countless theatre productions and TV shows worldwide.

== History ==
Strand Electric and Engineering Company, as it was originally named, was created in 1914. Arthur Earnshaw and Phillip Sheridan were both London theatre electricians when they set up their company.

In 1932, Frederick Bentham joined Strand. He would go on to revolutionise theatre lighting with his designs. The Light Console was the first remote control theatre lighting console, while Pattern 23 (the first mass-produced spotlight) and Pattern 264 spotlights were further creations. The company incorporated as Strand Electric Holdings in 1936.

In 1968, Strand Lighting was purchased by The Rank Organisation and thus became Rank Strand.

In 1969, Rank took over Century Lighting (Started in New York in 1929) which became Strand Century in the US.

In 1976, Rank acquired Stagesound Ltd from Theatre Projects and created Rank Strand Sound.

In 1986, Rank Strand bought Quartzcolor, an Italian-based manufacturer of TV & film lighting.

In 1990, Strand Lighting became the first company (and only North American company) to achieve ISO9000 Quality certification.

Strand was bought from Rank by a venture capitalist group called Schroder Ventures in 1996.

On 11 July 2006, the Genlyte Group, a US company, announced its acquisition of Strand Lighting. Genlyte was acquired by Royal Philips Lighting in 2008. The lighting division of Philips was spun off from the parent company in 2016, and in 2018, Philips Lighting became Signify. Strand Lighting is run as an independent brand within Signify, along with Vari-Lite, and continues as a leading name in stage, television, motion picture, and architectural lighting and services. Following the shift from Philips to Signify, Vari-Lite and Strand regained their standalone brand status in 2019, with a renewed commitment from the business to innovate and support the visions of creative artists worldwide.

On Tuesday, July 11, 2022, Strand Lighting, LLC. voluntarily filed for Chapter 7 bankruptcy in a Dallas, TX court. When asked about the filing, Signify stated that this filing is a part of the ongoing unifying branding effort to centralize its entertainment lighting products in a single legal entity, Vari-Lite LLC, and with focus on the Vari-Lite brand for all new entertainment products.

== See also ==
- Frederick Bentham
- Lighting control console
- Stage lighting instrument
