= High End Systems =

Lighting and control system company

High End Systems is an Austin, Texas-based manufacturer of entertainment lighting and control systems. The company was founded, owned, and managed by Lowell Fowler, Richard Belliveau, David Blair, and Bob Schacherl before it was bought by Belgium-based Barco in 2008.

== Early history ==
Blackstone Audio Visual was founded by Lowell Fowler with his wife Sue. When Lowell Fowler began Blackstone Audio Visual, their main focus was installing more advanced lighting equipment in nightclubs.

Blackstone Audio Visual moved offices from central to north Austin in the mid 1980s. David Blair and Bob Schacherl, one of the companies original employees, both joined the ranks of partnership. The three partners installed Pulsar, Clay Paky, Coemar, Optikinetics, JEM, and other European brands that were difficult to find in North America. At the same time, Belliveau began designing and building loudspeakers for nightclubs and discothèques. Blackstone Audio Visual specialized in installing high end audio, video, and lighting systems in nightclubs all over the United States. Belliveau, unsatisfied with the design of many of the products they were selling, chose to design his own.

== High End Systems ==
In 1987, Belliveau began experimenting with dichroic filters and designed a color fading lighting instrument called Color Pro. It used three MR-16 lamps to crossfade between colors, which was unique at the time. At the time dichroic filters, which are color-tuned thin-film filters deposited on hardened glass, were very expensive. Belliveau bought a used vacuum chamber and directed employees to re-build it for the purpose of manufacturing their own dichroic filters. There were no other lighting companies that made their own dichroic filters. Color Pro was distributed worldwide through a newly established distributor network.

Around the same time, Belliveau set up a manufacturing division called Lightwave Research for the purpose of designing and building new products. Another new company called High End Systems was incorporated in order to separate the installation company, Blackstone Audio Visual, from the sales and distribution of equipment

The next products to be designed and built were the Laser Chorus and Dataflash. Laser Chorus was a laser system with 4.9-milliwatt gas laser tubes available in red, yellow, green, and orange. The heads were controlled by a microprocessor-based controller and they were capable of producing effects such as tunnels, planes, and various other geometric shapes and patterns. Because they were not over 5 milliwatts they were Class IIIA lasers and did not require a variance to operate in most states in the U.S.

Dataflash was a microprocessor-controlled strobe system with DMX512 control. It was used on high-profile tours, including the Michael Jackson Dangerous tour, as well as in nightclubs.

== Intellabeam launched ==
Intellabeam automated light was introduced in 1989. Until that time, most automated lighting in the live event production industry were rented, and Vari-Lite dominated the concert and touring market. The Intellabeam allowed production companies to buy their own automated lighting and rent them for concert tours and corporate events.

== Later years ==
In 2000, High End Systems introduced a digital projection system with a video projector, Orbital Mirror Head, and a DMX-controlled media server that interfaced with a lighting console. It allowed a lighting programmer to program the video switching and effects into the lighting console and play them back as part of the light show. The first such system was called Catalyst, but Catalyst evolved into the DMX-controlled media server in 2002 while the Orbital Mirror Head was marketed alone. Up until that point, media servers were manually operated systems where the media, either tape or video computer files, were switched using a push button matrix switcher or a T-handle switcher to crossfade between sources.

That era marked the beginning of High End Systems' immersion in digital luminaires. Soon after Catalyst, they introduced the DL.1 Digital Luminaire, a moving yoke projection system under the control of DMX512. It required the use of an external media server but the next evolutions of the product, the DL.2, DL.3, and DL.V all have media servers built in. The integration of media servers in their digital luminaires led to the development of another media server, the Axon Media Server.

In 2017, High End Systems was acquired by Electronic Theatre Controls.
