= Imero Fiorentino =

American lighting designer (1928–2013)

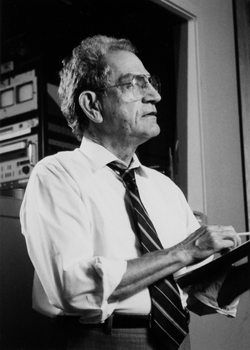
- Imero Fiorentino
- Born: July 12, 1928; Brooklyn, New York, U.S.
- Died: October 1, 2013 (aged 85); New York City, New York, U.S.
- Known for: Lighting designer and consultant, television lighting

Imero (Immie) Fiorentino (July 12, 1928 – October 1, 2013) was an American lighting designer, considered one of the most respected pioneers and leaders in the American entertainment industry. Beginning his career as a lighting designer in the Golden Age of Television, he designed productions for such celebrated series as Omnibus, U.S. Steel Hour, Pulitzer Prize Playhouse and Kraft Television Theatre. Fiorentino's expertise was often called upon by industry professionals throughout the world to consult on the planning and development of major productions, exhibits, museums and architectural projects; from the Republican National Convention and Democratic National Convention and numerous United States presidential election debates, major concert tours and television specials to the environmental lighting for Epcot’s World Showcase at Walt Disney World. His consulting work on major corporate events with clients included: Anheuser-Busch, Michelin, Electrolux, American Express and Xerox.

== Early life and education ==
Fiorentino was born in Brooklyn, New York, the son of Sicilian parents Margaret Viola (a doll dress maker who later worked for a real estate agency) and Dominick Fiorentino (an artist who painted the faces on the Dy-Dee Dolls), who met in New York. As a young boy, he enjoyed trips to Radio City Music Hall with his uncle as he became more and more fascinated with theatre, especially lighting and set design. He turned to books to learn everything he could on the art. In junior high school and later at Lafayette High School in Brooklyn, he joined the stage squad and did the lighting and set design for plays. In high school he was encouraged by a wonderful teacher, Florence Druss, who understood immediately his aptitude for lighting design and encouraged him to pursue it as a career and to go on to college. In his junior year, his life’s plan was mapped out for him and he was accepted to Carnegie Tech, now Carnegie Mellon University. In the year prior to his high school graduation, however, he had a horrible accident and lost one eye. He felt his great plans were in shambles now because, without depth perception, he thought it would be impossible to design lighting. However, his high school teacher and mentor came to the hospital and told him that no one would know he only had one eye and he “would still be the best lighting designer ever.” The teacher saw the course the young man needed to be on and convinced him to continue on with his plans so, with great sacrifice from his family, Fiorentino attended Carnegie Tech majoring in theatre.

After graduation, his plans to teach and design at Indiana State University the following fall were circumvented by the loss of his father. He undertook the new role as breadwinner for his family. He made the rounds at NBC, DuMont and ABC looking for immediate employment. When interviewed for a position with ABC, Fiorentino admitted he knew nothing about television lighting to which the interviewer replied, “So what? Nobody does.” Television was a new medium in 1950 and everything was a learning curve. Fiorentino recalls, “The man called back later and said, ‘I can hire you as a lighting director for television.’ I said, ‘Who's going to teach me?’ He said, ‘Nobody's going to teach you.’ I said, ‘Well, how will I know if it's right?’ He said, ‘If it looks good, remember how you did it.’ I started the next day.”

== Career ==
=== ABC Lighting Designer ===
Fiorentino’s lighting career began during the “Golden Age” of television, when his TV credits included Omnibus, U.S. Steel Hour, The Voice of Firestone, Pulitzer Prize Playhouse, and the Bolshoi Ballet’s first televised appearance in the U.S. Broadcasts were still in black and white. There was no videotape or retakes. Everything was done “live.” Early television images required an intense amount of light in order for transmission of an image to appear on the screen and often employed banks of fluorescent lights. Coming from a theatre background, however, Fiorentino stayed away from the fluorescents and selected lighting instruments that would give a more modeled effect. Word got around quickly that his technique was artistic and directors began requesting his services. Fiorentino worked with such directors in those early years of television as Sidney Lumet, John Frankenheimer, Charles Dubin and Alex Segal. Lighting directors that worked on those early television programs invented lighting techniques as they went. For ten years Fiorentino worked as an ABC lighting designer as one of a small circle of lighting pioneers at other networks including Bob Barry and Greg Harney.

=== Imero Fiorentino Associates ===
In 1960 Immie left ABC to form Imero Fiorentino Associates (IFA.) As the television industry expanded, Fiorentino foresaw the need of independent production companies producing much of the networks' content and their need for experienced lighting designers. Before long IFA became the go-to company for freelance lighting designers. Lighting designers from various networks came to work at IFA such as Fred McKinnon, George Reisenberger, Ken Palius, Leard Davis, William Knight, William Klages, Greg Brunton, Carl Vitelli, Richard Weiss, Carl Gibson, Stig Edgren, Tony DiGirolamo, Alan Adelman, Robert Dickinson, Vince Cilurzo, Jim Tetlow, Marilyn Lowey, John Conti, Jeff Calderon, and Jeff Engle. Over time the business expanded to provide both lighting and set design, production, staging and technical supervision for television and live events; everything from Broadway productions to political conventions, educational seminars to architectural lighting consultation.

Fiorentino's creativity was evidenced by his participation as leader of the IFA team serving as design and lighting consultants for fourteen Democratic and Republican National Conventions.

He led the team that designed the environmental lighting for the World Showcase Pavilions at Walt Disney World's Epcot in Orlando, Florida; the exhibition lighting and staging of the famous Howard Hughes Flying Boat "Spruce Goose" aircraft in Long Beach, CA.; Neil Diamond international concert tours and television specials for which he received two Emmy Award nominations; he also lit the legendary industrial show extravaganza (the granddaddy of corporate theater), The Milliken Breakfast Show for 21 years.

Fiorentino was also responsible for spearheading IFA's role as designers and consultants for many large television facilities around the country. He headed the IFA team that redesigned the lighting during the 1991 renovation of Madison Square Garden and designed the WaMu Theater housed in the Garden.

Additionally, his credits include: Frank Sinatra - The Main Event, televised live from Madison Square Garden, El Cordobes: The Bullfight of the Century, transmitted live from Spain to 28 countries via satellite, the historic mass audience rock concert event, California Jam and the Broadway show, The Night That Made America Famous. He has served as consultant to every U.S. President since Dwight D. Eisenhower, and to a multitude of major political candidates in television appearances and campaigns, as well as numerous Presidential Debates. He was hired to do the television lighting the day after the first Kennedy-Nixon debate where Nixon looked awful as the bright studio lighting exaggerated his jowls and sunken eyes. He lit the first-ever pictures that were transmitted to outer space and back to Earth via “Telstar 1” in 1962. Fiorentino and William Knight were the lighting designers for the historic Barbra Streisand - A Happening in Central Park, Sept. 16, 1968.

=== Post-IFA ===
In 1996, Caribiner International acquired IFA and Imero Fiorentino joined the global communications company as Senior Vice President. Caribiner was subsequently acquired by Jack Morton Worldwide where he continued in the same capacity. During the 2000 and 2008 political conventions, Fiorentino was the overall lighting designer for the Fox News coverage. In 2002, he entered the latest phase of his career as an independent lighting and production consultant.

== Family ==
Fiorentino was married to Carole Hamer from 1953 to 1963 and they had one daughter, Linda. He married Angela Linsell, an artist, in 1970. His daughter Linda, a minister, is married to Ken Crabbs. They have a son, Christian Imero Fiorentino Crabbs.

== Death ==
He died in New York City on October 1, 2013.

== Bibliography ==
- Fiorentino, Imero (2017). Let There Be Light, An Illuminating Life. Xlibris. ISBN 9781543424195.

At the time of his death, Fiorentino had been working on his memoir. His wife, Angela, completed it and Let There Be Light, An Illuminating Life, was published in 2017.

== Associations ==
- National Academy of Television Arts & Sciences: served on the Board of Governors of the National Academy of Television Arts & Sciences and was its Vice President from 1971 to 1975
- Illuminating Engineering Society
- International Tape Association
- International Industrial Television Association
- International Teleproduction Society
- International Radio and Television Society

== Awards and recognitions ==
- 2012 Wally Lifetime Achievement Award
- U.S. Institute Of Theatre Technology Award
- 1992 Silver Circle Honoree, National Academy of Television Arts & Sciences
- Art Directors Club Award
- Illuminating Engineering Society:
  - Award Of Merit
  - Section Award
  - Award Of Excellence
  - Lumen Award
- Carnegie Mellon University:
  - Merit Award
  - Distinguished Alumni Award
  - L. Blair Award Of Excellence
- Emmy Award Nominations (3)
- VPA Pioneer Award
- USITT Distinguished Lighting Designer Award
