= Percy George Bentham =

British sculptor

Percy George Bentham (1883–1936) was a British sculptor whose works include portrait busts, statues and several war memorials. He was a member of the Royal Society of British Sculptors, and a member of the Art Workers' Guild.

He was born in Fulham in 1883. He studied at City and Guilds of London School of Art under William Silver Frith, the Royal Academy School, and in Paris. In 1907 he was awarded a first prize of £20 and a silver medal, for a set of four models of a figure from the life. He was a pupil of Alfred Drury R.A., and assistant to Albert Bruce-Joy and also in the studio of William Robert Colton.

== Career ==
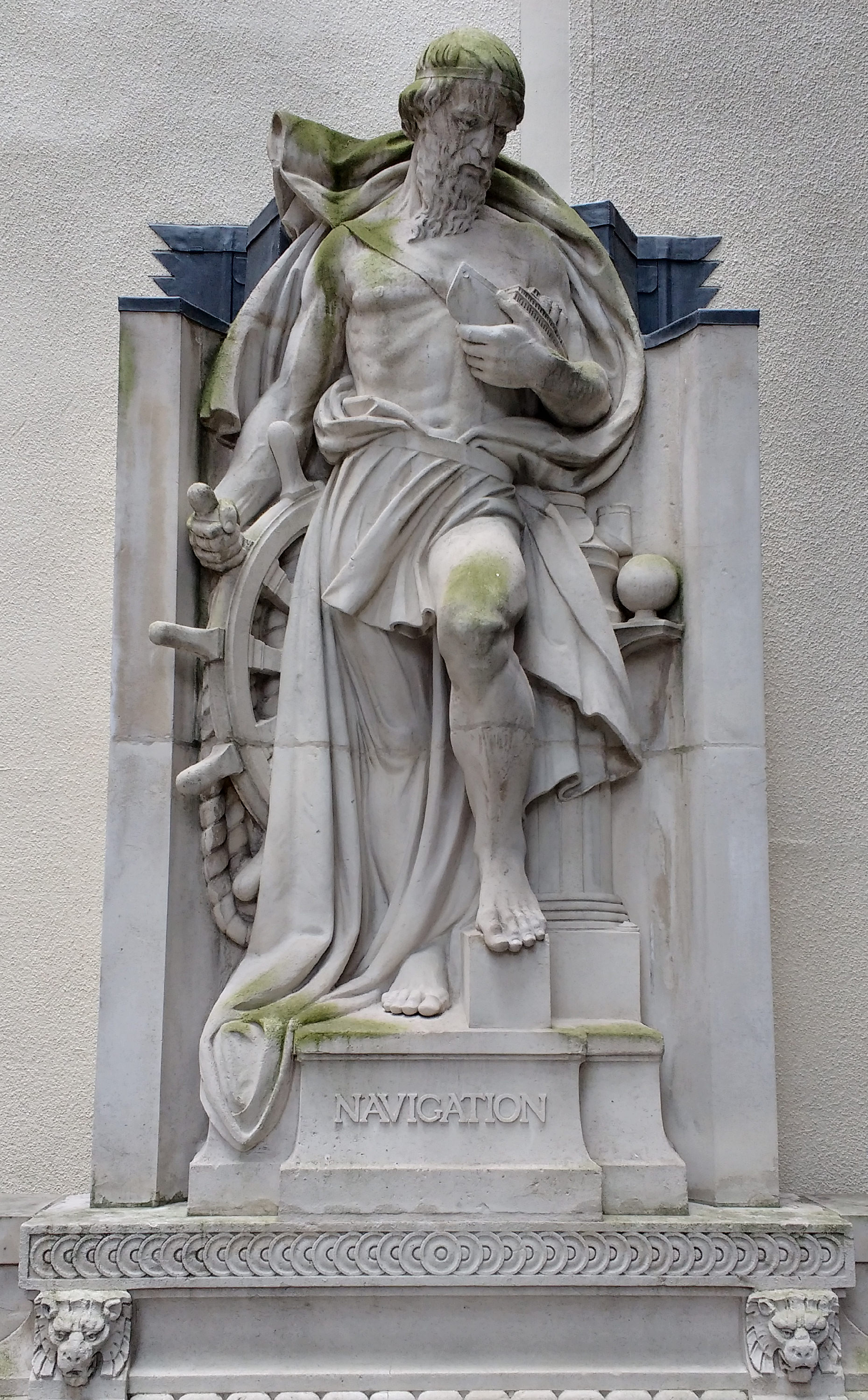
Navigation

He exhibited at the Royal Academy from 1915 to 1930.

One of his works is 'Navigation', a stone relief on the Leadenhall building in the City of London, formerly the site of the Peninsular & Oriental Steam Navigation Company.

The plaster for ‘Fisherman and Nymph’ had been exhibited at the Royal Academy in 1922. It was cast in bronze and is now in the lake at Coombe Abbey Country Park.

In the 1920s he produced several War Memorials: Audenshaw, Greater Manchester (1920), Haydon Bridge, Northumberland (1921), Trowbridge, Dukinfield and Ballywalter, co. Down.

He produced carvings in 1924 for the War Memorial building at Felsted School, and the memorial reredos at St James Church, Emsworth.

In 1932 at Eaton Socon he did much work on the rebuilding of the church after a fire, including "a rood screen, choir benches, parclose screens, roofing, and the organ case, all in Suffolk oak. The stone carving includes many symbolical corbel groups and portraits. Among the faces are those of the Bishop of St Albans, the Archdeacon of Bedford, the vicar of Eaton Socon, the churchwardens, the architect, the clerk of the works, and the builders' foreman."

He worked on the Great Hall at University College London, in 1932 and carved decorations for the Mocatta Theatre, including the relief portraits in bronze of Mr. Mocatta and Mr. Gustave Tuck.

He carved the new pulpit for St Stephen's Church, St Albans. He also produced some bronze door handles for the Jockey Club, Newmarket, and at Ascot the carved heads of the arches of the Royal Pavilion.

Other work includes two lions in bronze for Halifax, Nova Scotia, the models for the sculptural decorations in the British Government Buildings, in Antwerp, and statues at the Harbour Board Offices in Liverpool.

He also designed decorations for the South Eastern Electricity Board.

He was an associate of the Royal British Society of Sculptors and a member of the Chelsea Arts Club.

== Personal life ==
He married Ellen Celia Hobbs in 1909 at St Matthew's Church, Willesden. They had three children, Frederick (b 1911), Philip (b 1913) and Celia (b 1927), all born in Willesden. Philip became a sculptor like his father and is best known for The Coventry Boy, while Frederick became a renowned theatre lighting expert. In 1911 the family were living in Harlesden. Later he had a studio at 8A Gunter Grove, off the Fulham Road. In 1936 he lived on Pebworth Road, Wembley. He died on the 17 June 1936 at St Bartholomew's Hospital.

It has been incorrectly claimed that his grandfather was the British philosopher Jeremy Bentham. Jeremy Bentham was famously a lifelong bachelor and had no children, whose only family upon his death in 1832 were the children of brother, Samuel Bentham. Moreover, Percy Bentham was born 141 years after Jeremy Bentham, making it impossible for the former to have been the latter's grandson.
