= Barco (manufacturer) =

Belgian technology company

Barco NV
- Type: Naamloze vennootschap
- Traded as: Euronext Brussels: BAR; BEL 20 component
- ISIN: BE0974362940
- Industry: Technology
- Founded: 12, September 1934; 91 years ago
- Founder: Lucien De Puydt
- Headquarters: Kortrijk, Belgium
- Key people: Charles Beauduin (Chairman of the Board) & An Steegen (CEO)
- Products: display technology, projection technology, connectivity platforms, image processing
- Revenue: €963.8 million (FY2025)
- Number of employees: 3253 (2025)
- Website: www.barco.com

Barco NV is a global technology company that specializes in visualization, collaboration, and networking technology, focusing on three core markets: entertainment, enterprise, and healthcare. It employs more than 3000 employees worldwide. The company has 900+ granted patents. Barco is headquartered in Kortrijk, Belgium, and has its own facilities for Sales & Marketing, Customer Support, R&D and Manufacturing in Europe, North America and Asia-Pacific. Shares of Barco are listed on Euronext Brussels. It has a market cap of around €1.28 billion (July 2025). As of early 2026, the company reported annual sales of €963.8 million for the 2025 fiscal year.

== History ==
Barco is an acronym that originally stood for Belgian American Radio Corporation. Barco was founded in 1934 in the town of Poperinge, in the Flemish-speaking region of Belgium. Founder Lucien de Puydt's initial business was to assemble radios from parts imported from the United States – hence the name of his company, the Belgium American Radio Corporation, or "Barco".

Radio pioneer Camiel Descamps gave the company a new start in 1941 in Kortrijk after founder Lucien Depuydt died. His wife, Maria-Anna Reyntjens, and his brother-in-law Joseph Versavel assisted him. Later on, also Elie Timmerman joined them.

In 1949, Barco started developing a multi-standard television that accepted different signal standards. A jukebox called Barc-O-Matic was sold from 1951. In 1967, it was one of the first European companies to introduce color TV. Building on this, it then entered the professional broadcast market in the late 1960s, supplying TV monitors to broadcasters.

From the 1960s onwards, Barco branched out into numerous other activities, which included mechanical components for industrial use and quality control monitoring for the textile and plastics industries. In 1967, Barco became the first European manufacturer to produce transistor-based portable televisions.

In 2018, Barco collaborated with China Film Group Corporation (CFGC), Appotronics, and CITICPE to commercialize each company's products and services. In Barco's case, this involved the company's cinema projectors.

In 2024, Barco underwent a leadership transition with An Steegen assuming the sole CEO role, succeeding the dual-CEO structure previously held with Charles Beauduin. During this period, the company focused on expanding its manufacturing footprint, opening a new factory in Wuxi, China in May 2024.

=== Sustainability ===
In 2025, Barco reported a 61% reduction in absolute carbon emissions compared to its 2015 baseline. This surpassed the company’s original 2025 target of 45%. The company has since committed to new SBTi-approved targets for 2030, which include a 25% reduction in Scope 3 emissions and a supplier engagement program requiring 30% of its key suppliers to set their own science-based targets.

In 2025, Barco was recognized by The Financial Times and Statista as one of Europe's Climate Leaders and by Time Magazine and Statista as one of the world's most sustainable companies for the second consecutive year.

== Acquisitions ==
- In 1989, Barco acquired EMT, a manufacturer of phonograph turntables and professional audio equipment, which became Barco-EMT.
- Barco Graphics was the graphics division of the Belgian Barco Group. It was the result of the 1989 merger of Digitized Information Systems Corporation (D.I.S.C.), Aesthedes and Barco's own "Creative Systems" group.
- In 1995, Barco acquired Elbicon, a manufacturer of inspection systems for the food processing industry.
- In 1997, Barco acquired Electronic Image Systems (EIS), a manufacturer of CRT projectors for the flight simulation market.
- In 1998, Barco acquired Dr. Seufert, a manufacturer of visual sub-systems for integration in process control rooms.
- In 1998, Barco ETS, now Ucamco acquired Gerber Systems Corp., a manufacturer of plotters and automatic optical inspection (AOI) systems for printed circuit boards.
- In 1999, it acquired Metheus Corporation, a Tektronix spin-off and manufacturer of professional graphics controllers.
- In 2000, it acquired Texen, a subsidiary of Thales (ex-Thomson).
- In 2004, it acquired Voxar, a 3D medical imaging software company.
- In 2004, it acquired Folsom Research, Inc., whose product lines cover image processing, image communication and image functionality & interactivity.
- In 2008, it acquired High End Systems, an automated luminaires, digital lighting and lighting controls company.
- In 2010, it acquired Fimi S.r.l., a company specialized in medical image displays, from Philips (no relationship with Fimi, Federazione Industria Musicale Italiana).
- In 2010, it acquired all intellectual property of Element Labs, a manufacturer of LED equipment.
- In 2010, it acquired dZine, a Belgium-based company specialized in Digital signage.
- In 2012, it acquired IP Video Systems, a company specialized in networked visualization.
- In 2012, it acquired JAOtech, a manufacturer of patient entertainment and point-of-care terminals for hospitals.
- In 2013, it acquired AWIND, a manufacturer of hardware and software for wireless presentation systems.
- In 2013, it acquired projectiondesign, a manufacturer of projection technology.
- In 2014, it acquired X20 Media Inc., an enterprise communication specialist.
- In 2014, it acquired IOSONO GmbH, a 3D audio expert.
- In 2015, it acquired Advan Inc., a manufacturer of LCD displays.
- In 2016, it acquired Medialon Inc., a US based company.
- In 2016, it acquired MTT Innovation Inc., a Canadian developer of next-generation projection technology (HDR).
- In 2019, it acquired a 5% stake in Unilumin group, a china based LED manufacturer.
- In 2026, it acquired VerVent Audio Holding (“VerVent”), a French-British premium audio company active in high end audio systems, headphones and automotive OEM audio solutions, with premium audio brands Focal and Naim.

== Divestments ==
- In 2000, Barco split its shares in Barco New and BarcoNet which is taken over by Scientific-Atlanta in 2001 and becomes whole owner of a after buy-out of the remaining shareholders in 2002.
- In 2001, Barco Graphics was acquired by Danish Purup-Eskofot, and renamed Esko-Graphics, which was again renamed Esko in 2006.
- In 2003, Barco sold Barco-EMT including trademarks to Walter Derrer. The company is continued as EMT Studiotechnik GmbH.
- In 2004, Barco sold its Dotrix activity to Agfa–Gevaert.
- In 2007, BarcoVision was acquired by Itema from Bergamo, Italy.
- In 2008, Barco sold its Advanced Visualisation (AVIS) group (the previously acquired Voxar) to Toshiba Medical (TMSC).
- In 2014, Barco divested a wholly owned subsidiary of Barco NV, Barco Orthogon, based in Bremen, Germany, to Exelis.
- In 2015, Barco's Defense & Aerospace division was sold to US-based Esterline Technologies Corporation (NYSE: ESL).
- In 2017, Barco sold High End Systems to Electronic Theatre Controls.
- In 2018, Barco's X20 Media was sold to Stratacache.
- In 2018, Barco divested the wholly owned subsidiary Barco Silex, which becomes Silex Inside.

== Management ==
- CEO 2024 An Steegen
- CEO 2021-2024 Charles Beauduin & An Steegen
- CEO 2016-2021 Jan De Witte
- CEO 2008–2016 Eric Van Zele
- CEO 2002–2008 Martin De Prycker
- CEO 2002 Hugo Vandamme

== Active markets ==
- Entertainment: theaters, immersive experiences
- Enterprise: control rooms, meeting rooms
- Healthcare: diagnostic imaging, digital operating room

== See also ==
- Barco Creator
- Barco Escape
