= Vari-Lite =

Stage lighting brand

- Industry: Intelligent lights, Stage lighting, Digital signal processing
- Founded: 1980
- Fate: Acquired
- Number of employees: 10,570
- Website: https://www.vari-lite.com/global

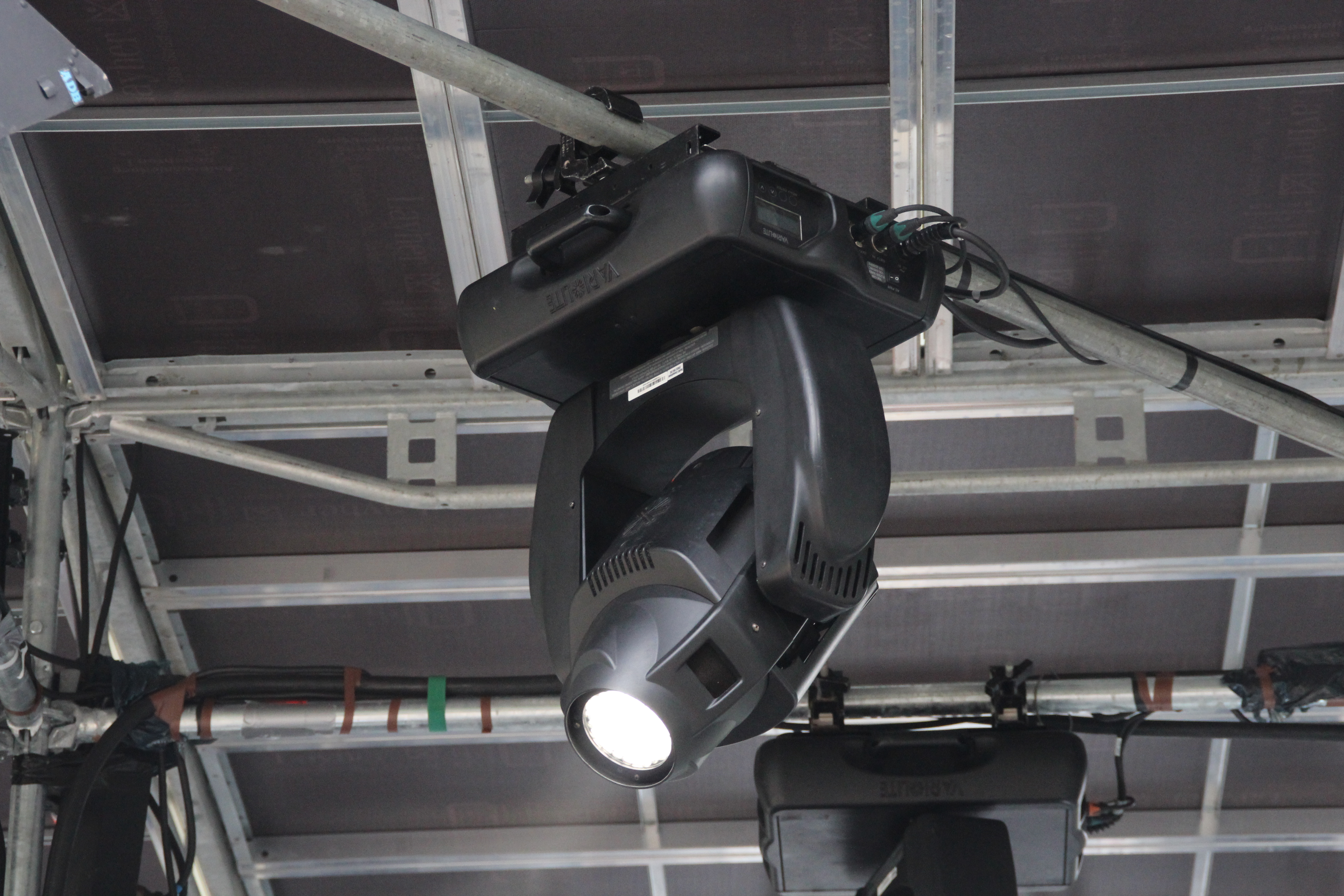
A Vari-Lite Moving head

Vari-Lite is a brand of automated, variable-colour stage lighting systems. Their intelligent lighting fixtures are commonly used in theatre, concerts, television, film and corporate events.

== History ==
=== Pre-history ===
The origins of Vari-Lite date to the late 1960s, when college friends Jack Calmes and Rusty Brutsché played together in a Texas-based blues band. They built a sound system for their shows that attracted the attention of other acts, who asked to rent it from them.

In March 1970, Calmes and Brutsché, together with sound engineer Jack Maxson, incorporated Showco, with the intention of supplying sound systems to regional rock concerts. The company initially operated two sound systems and two trucks from Maxson's garage. The company quickly grew, both in size and reputation, and added lighting equipment to its inventory in 1972.

By the end of the 1970s, Showco's lighting equipment was becoming outdated, and the company could not afford to replace it.

=== Invention ===
In 1980, Showco engineer Jim Bornhorst discovered that twisting dichroic filters alters the frequencies of light filtered, resulting in an apparent color change. The company exploited this discovery by constructing a fixture equipped with two motors to move the light. An initial prototype of a fully automated lighting system, featuring a General Electric Marc 350 metal-halide arc lamp, was built in twelve weeks.

Showco representatives demonstrated the prototype—known today as the VL-Zero—to members of the British band Genesis, having programmed it to enact two simple cues. Genesis, already a regular Showco client, immediately invested $1 million in the new technology, although a working model, later known as the VL1, would not be available until the band embarked on its Abacab tour. Showco used the capital to develop the control console, power distribution, and digital data transmission equipment required to implement the system.

=== Growth and expansion ===
The company subsequently incorporated as Vari-Lite Inc. and struck distribution deals to introduce the product into international markets.

The Series 200 system launched in 1987, featuring the Artisan Control Console and two new luminaires: the VL2—a direct descendant of the VL1—and the VL3, based on the VL-Zero. This was followed by the VL4, a more compact and brighter version of the VL3, and two upgrades of the original VL2: the VL2B and the VL2C. A smaller backup console was also launched, called the Mini-Artisan.

In 1994, Vari-lite set up Irideon Inc. to manufacture automated lighting products for the architectural lighting market, selling it off to Electronic Theatre Controls four years later.

In 1997 the company floated on Nasdaq (NASDAQ:LITE), selling two million shares, in a move which allowed the company to retire almost half its debt. Forty-seven percent of the company remained in the hands of Genesis and Vari-Lite management. The company then began to buy back the franchises it had created in previous years in favor of establishing new rental offices that offered conventional third-party lighting equipment alongside its own products.

In 2002, the VARI*LITE luminaire manufacturing and sales divisions were sold to the Genlyte Group. The rental division, retaining the console division, and continued to develop the Virtuoso product line, eventually merging with the Production Resource Group (PRG) in 2004. In early 2008, the Genlyte Group was bought by Royal Philips Lighting. Under Philips ownership, the VLX wash, a high-intensity LED luminaire, was developed.

Having separated from its parent company Royal Philips, Philips Lighting rebranded as Signify in 2019. Vari-Lite and stablemate Strand regain their stand-alone brand status.

=== Accolades ===
The company has won three Primetime Emmy Awards for technical achievement: in 1991, for Outstanding Achievement in Engineering, in the development of the Series 200 system; in 1994, for the development of the VL5; and in 2001 for Outstanding Achievement in Engineering for the Virtuoso console.

=== Patent infringement lawsuits ===
In 1989 Vari-Lite sued Syncrolite, Inc. and founder, former Showco president Jack Calmes, over alleged patent infringements. Calmes countersued, claiming that his former business partners had kept the development of the Vari-Lite system from him at the time of his departure, causing him to lose money when he sold his Showco stock. The case was resolved in Vari-Lite's favour.

In August 1995 Vari-lite sued High End Systems, seeking unspecified damages and an injunction against the manufacture of the Status Cue system, including the Cyberlight and Studio Color luminaires. The matter was eventually resolved out of court.

In 1999, Vari-lite obtained a preliminary injunction against Danish firm Martin Gruppen A/S, which barred the import, sale and lease of several lighting products within the United States. Martin responded by releasing updated products that lay outside the scope of Vari-Lite's patents.

== Control systems ==
From the very start, Vari*Lite consoles were computerised, transmitting digital multiplexed signals to the luminaires.

=== Series 100 ===
Originally known simply as The Vari-lite System, Series 100 used a patented protocol based on RS-422, which sent positional, beam and colour information, via a rack-mounted computer, to up to 32 individual Vari-lite luminaires (later known as VL1s), at up to 30 times a second. Up to three computers could be linked together under the control of a single console, giving a maximum system size of 96 luminaires.

The transmissions were unidirectional, and the error checking was quite rudimentary, checking each transmission bit 5 times and applying the majority result. As the information was retransmitted multiple times each second, the result was no noticeable errors by the luminaires. However, the refresh rate of a full 96 channel system was visibly noticeable if, the low-numbered channels were rigged close to high-numbered channels (in Vari*Lite jargon, a "channel" referred to a whole device, regardless of how many parameters it had).

In order to distribute both power and data, 6 channel "dumb" repeater boxes were used. The cables carried both data and power. In order to meet safety standards, the data cable was rated at 600 v, to allow it to be used in 3 phase power applications. The channel number (also known as an address) was set with three thumbwheel switches on each lite and a common practical joke on the part of non-Vari-lite crew, would be to renumber random "lites" (this became a common way of referring to a Vari*Lite unit on both sides of the Atlantic).

The designation Series 100 was not applied until 1987, upon the release of the Series 200 system.

=== Series 200 ===
By contrast, the Series 200 system was designed to employ a proprietary, bidirectional protocol. Each luminaire became "intelligent"—storing its own positional, beam and colour information, and reacting to a global "memory cue" command, so every luminaire reacted simultaneously (see US Patent No.5010459). This overcame the limitations imposed by the processor power available at the time, on the maximum number of luminaires that could be controlled from one console.

The Series 200 system was introduced in 1987 and featured the VL2 and VL3 luminaires, controlled by the Artisan console, with power and data distributed to dumb repeater boxes by an ACS Rack. The repeaters gained three more outputs, making nine in total. Up to seven repeater boxes (63 luminaires) could be supplied by one ACS rack. Multiple ACS racks could be linked together, data-wise, with one acting as a master and the other as slaves.

Manchester encoding was used to improve transmission resilience and a polling system was introduced to get feedback (known as Reply Data) from each luminaire. Damaged cables and "chattering" lites could cause problems in larger systems, as they introduced noise into the reply data lines running back to the Artisan console, causing luminaires to appear offline. Although this did not normally affect the playback of cues, it could cause severe problems when trying to save and backup the system data onto the 1.44Mb, 3.5 inch floppy discs that were standard at the time.

Under Series 200, the number of controllable channels (i.e. luminaires) was increased—at least on paper—to 1000; but in reality, the practical maximum was around 400. The reason for this discrepancy, was that if a luminaire had not been polled for (and had therefore not sent) its reply data within a certain time, it would become regarded as "offline" by the Artisan console. In a system of over 400 luminaires, the limitations of the hardware in the Artisan, meant that it was not possible for the console to poll all the luminaires within the allotted time.

The performance of the Series 200 system was greatly improved over its working life, through a rolling program of upgrades, modifications and retrofits. Central to these were the various software versions, which progressively refined the programming features available to Artisan console operators.

The VL4 wash luminaire was officially added to the Series 200 luminaire range in 1991.

=== Series 300 ===
By the end of the 1980s, the market for moving lights was firmly established—a market which had arguably been created single-handedly by Vari-lite themselves. However, the high cost of renting a Vari-lite system and the fact that they could only be programmed from an Artisan console, by a specially trained operator, were barriers to full realisation of market potential. Additionally, despite the protection afforded to Vari-lite technology through the use of patents, rival manufacturers were beginning to market competing moving lights; along with consoles which could control their functions using the DMX512 protocol. There were also general market concerns regarding the overall size and weight of moving lights in general, which limited the number of them that could be hung on a lighting rig and made them impractical for many small / medium scale productions.

The Series 300 system was developed to address these issues. Series 300 was not strictly a new protocol, but a development of Series 200 that moved most of the processing away from the luminaires and into the repeater box, thus creating the Vari-lite "Smart Repeater" (VLSR—see US Patent Nos. 5209560 and 5329431). The VLSR is able to distinguish between Vari-lite Series 200 and DMX512 data signals, and can be controlled with either—although not both simultaneously (merging). Having identified the type of incoming control signal, the VLSR converts it into Series 300 data; which it sends to the luminaires, along with the 24V power lines required to drive the motors. Up to six Series 300 luminaires can be controlled via one VLSR, using Series 300 Smart Lamp Runs (SLR)

When controlled by a Series 200 data signal, the VLSR stored the cue information (in much the same way that Series 200 luminaires did) and transmitted the raw positional and colour information to the luminaires, as Series 300 data. In this case, the Series 200 input connector was used to supply both power and data. When controlled by a DMX512 data signal, all cue information is stored in and transmitted from the lighting console; with the VLSR simply acting as a translating device, which converts the DMX signal to Series 300 data in real time. In this case, the Series 200 input connector is used only to supply mains power to the VLSR, with DMX data being input via a separate, standard, 5-pin XLR connector.

The first Series 300 luminaire was the VL5 wash, released in late 1992, along with the VLSR. The VL6 spot luminaire was released in 1994 and the VL7 in 1998; with updated variants of all luminaires being developed, following their respective, initial releases.

== Control consoles ==
=== Series 100 Prototype Control Console ===
Only one of these was ever built, and only had two control sections: Direct Cueing, where a memory number was entered on the keypad, assigned to the direct window and triggered by pressing the Go button, and Cross-Fade where two memories could be assigned to opposite ends of a pair of faders, and the luminaries would transition between cues. Each of the circuit cards in the system as well as the backplane of the system was hand wired, and the first operator, Dave Berger, one of the technicians who had built the unit, would take it out on tour with The Who and later with Paul Anka with the original seventeen 1st generation lites. The system was also used on The Kinks tour in 1983, then retired as new Series 100 Consoles and luminaires were built.

=== Series 100 Control Console ===
The production version of the Series 100 console was never given a name and was generally referred to as "the Vari-lite console". It now boasted four control methods: Direct, X-Fade, Chase and Matrix. Chase allowed a consecutive number of cues to be run automatically, although the speed had to be set by hand, and matrix allowed you to program some cues to have their intensity levels split into eight groups. The total cue storage was 256 cues, with sixteen assigned to the matrix. The remaining 239 could be used by any of the other control methods. In addition, there were two banks of sixteen programmable colour buttons, called "Preset Colours", and the active control of the luminaires could be divided into two banks of sixteen groups.

Later software versions allowed "Selective Store" and a quirk in the software allowed you to completely wipe a cue memory in a group of lites, and then only store the colour or beam information. Triggering a cue saved in this way would simply overlay the colour or beam information of a lite without changing its position. By 1986/87 it was common to see a good operator using both direct and x-fade controls overlaid by a selectively stored colour or beam chase at the same time.

=== Artisan Control Console ===
The Vari-Lite Artisan console was a quantum leap beyond the Series 100 console. Physically it was much larger and heavier at 210 lbs. (96 kg) with an ergonomic front panel. The lower surface was at shallow angle and the upper surface inclined greater for programming comfort. Initially system interface was through one proprietary multi- connector "snake" cable that was connected to the ACS rack. The Snake cable included power, bi-directional control data, and intercom lines. Typically two control snakes were run to provide backup should one fail. One of the great differences in the Series 200 and Series 100 communication data was the bi-directional communication of the Artisan console and connected Series 200 luminaries. VL2s, VL3s and VL4s could report function status of digital hardware (pass, fail), lamp status (on, off), lamp power supply (normal, short, open), function status of fixture mechanisms and over-temperature indications of fixture.

Fixture control was split into four different parameters now. Intensity, Color, Focus and Beam were integral to the programming and playback sections. Each parameter had at least one encoder wheel on the far left of the front panel next to preset buttons associated with each parameter for a total of seven wheels. Pan and tilt had separate larger encoder wheels with greater resolution. There were 20 preset buttons on 4 pages for focus, color and gobo. Below each preset button section there was a backlit area for a strip of vellum on which programmers could write labels. Shift buttons next to intensity, color and beam were later utilized to access sub-sets of attributes. Oddly, the beam parameter presets only stored gobo information so programmers had to manually set iris and frost to store to cues.

Photo of Artisan console.

Above the programming section on the inclined panel to the left was the fixture select panel. An intimidating array of 100 buttons numbered 1 through 100 were for fixture selection. To the left of those were another column of 10 buttons labeled 1, 100, 200, etc. Those were to access the next level of fixtures giving the console 1000 fixture capability which was unheard of at that time. To the right of the select buttons were the group select buttons. The fixture select buttons also gave the programmer intensity state and online status through button back light states (dimmed, illuminated or flashing). Selecting and deselecting fixtures could be a physically demanding process on larger shows. Sometimes described as swimming the English channel.

In the center upper panel was an LCD screen to display fixture icons. A vast improvement over the Series 100 small outboard CRT screen, it nonetheless was deleted on the Artisan Plus for an attached Macintosh with screen. Fixture intensity states and online status mimicked the fixture selection buttons as well as displaying timing states. That screen was also integral to fixture patch by assigning fixture types, fixture numbers and thumb wheel addresses.

The lower center section was dedicated to a numeric keypad grand master and playback faders. Playback opportunities were vastly improved with a two cross-fader masters, two direct masters, two chase masters and matrix master. Recorded cues were assigned to faders, the fader selected (made active) and then brought up to intensity. Each master could be masked using an interesting four segment button labeled IFBC above each fader. Programmers could have cues played back with only intensity active (for example) even though all parameters had been recorded. The Artisan console recorded everything, all the time unlike today's tracking consoles which only record parameter changes (in the simplest applications). However, to be recorded in a cue on Artisan, any fixture had to have an intensity state of - any intensity percentage above zero, at zero or marked (blacked out but ready). Fixtures that had the intensity state of out were not recorded in the cue and went to a null state (all parameters at default). A good programmer could easily spot a well programmed show when all the fixtures had good marking prior to becoming active in a cue or remained inert when not use during a succession of cues. Fixture parameters could also be filtered out of cues by using selective store. Especially useful in chase cues which were to be played back in addition to whole cues in direct masters.

On the right side were the Chase and Matrix panels. The Matrix contained 20 faders that allowed for 50 patches to assign all 1000 channels. Those patches were assigned to the matrix faders and gave the programmer intensity control for groups of fixtures within a cue. Very useful for flashing manually as there were bump buttons above each matrix fader. The Chase control had up to 200 chases containing any sequence of cues and direction of cue execution and rate was programmable. However, each step of a chase was an individual cue and programming extensive chase sequences was very challenging and tedious. Above those sections was the board control window which was used to record cue data, start and douse fixtures in addition to other commands.

==== Artisan Plus ====
In late 1995 and through 1996, Vari-Lite began upgrading the original Artisan consoles to Artisan plus consoles. The upgrade included replacing the control card cage (which included 4 cards) with a single more modern CPU, replacing the monochrome touchscreen with a notebook holder, and added a network interface panel. An outboard Apple Macintosh was added to provide visual feedback, disk operations, and macro control. The Macintosh PowerPC 6100 included a Magneto-Optical drive for disk operations, and used the Artisan DAta Management software (A.D.A.M.) to interface the console to the Macintosh, via an Appletalk/token ring 10BASE2 Ethernet. A serial connection allowed a second software package, VLQ to send serial commands to the console and trigger macros.

=== Mini Artisan Control Console ===
Originally designated as a back-up console for the Artisan, the Mini Artisan had much the same capabilities as the primary console. The console physical size was much less as the power supplies and processing were contained in an outboard metal case. The console was connected to that via umbilical multi-cable. Typically the Mini Artisan would be present backstage during load in to access luminaries as those came online. Once the main console was installed at the front of house position, the system tech would switch over control via the ACS rack. Before the show started, the Mini Artisan would be moved to the FOH position and connected via the second control “snake”. However, both consoles would not be online and tracking one another. Should there be a failure of the main console, the Vari-Lite operator would have to execute the current cues and/or chases on the Mini Artisan and the technician monitoring the system backstage would have to switch control over.

The overall front panel layout of the Mini Artisan was somewhat the same as the Artisan. Board control, manual control and chase control sections were in the same orientation as the Artisan.

Fixture selection, control and programming was more difficult. There were only three encoder wheels for all fixture perimeters which had to be accessed by a shift button. Next to the encoders were two preset store sections each with the ability to be group select, preset focus, preset color or preset gobo.

The Mini Artisan did not have a screen or outboard monitor so patching was through the board control section and numeric keypad. Individual fixture selection, cue programming and cue selection were also through the numeric keypad. Also missing was the matrix section of the Artisan.

Playback was limited to two direct and two chase faders so complex playback of a show programmed on the Artisan could be very challenging.

== Luminaires ==
=== Prototypes ===
==== VL-Zero ====
The prototype VL-Zero (VL0) was a dichroic colour fading wash unit. The original is still in semi-working condition at PRG. The colour change mechanism worked by twisting dichroic filters into and out of the beam path. This design proved impractical for the profile spot-type optics of the unit planned, but the idea was later revived in the company's wash luminaires, beginning with the VL3.

=== Series 100 luminaires ===
==== VL1 ====
The VL1 (Series 100) used dichroic filter, mounted onto three wheels with seven filters each, plus an open position. A fourth wheel was fitted with five beam apertures and two gobos. Pan and Tilt used servo motors, and intensity was controlled by an iris at the front of the head.

The Upper Enclosure (UPE—the "box" on which a moving head is mounted) contained the power supply for the lamp (the APS250) and a Data Receiver Card—a PCB which translated the cue information received from the console into low voltages; these were then (mostly) sent via a wiring harness to a servo amplifier card in the head, which provided the actual power that drove the motors. The Data Receiver Card also translated the lamp Start and Douse commands from the console and fed them to the APS, allowing the lamps to be switched on and off remotely, by the console operator.

The original choice of lamp—the GE Marc 350 projector lamp, a discharge lamp with a daylight colour temperature caused several problems and a less powerful, 250W lamp had to be substituted.

The Osram HTI 250 was selected as the replacement lamp for the new VL2 after the company experienced significant troubles with the original GE MARC350 lamp. Quality issues led to limited supplies of the lamp being available and the company did not want to base a new product on the MARC350. Vari-Lite eventually tried the HTI 250 in the VL1s for the same reason, lack of supply of good MARC350 lamps. They also tested the Philips MSD 250 lamp in the VL1 with some success. They had a projected lifetime of >1000 hrs, but by that time the VL1s were nearing retirement.

860 units were built between 1981 and 1984. Most of them were destroyed, but some four units are reported to still survive, two at PRG and two built from spares are in private hands. Some units were stolen, and may also still survive.

=== Series 200 luminaires ===
==== VL2 / VL2B / VL2C /VL2D ====
The VL2 was a moving head spot luminaire, designed to replace the VL1 and make use of the bi-directional communication afforded by the Series 200 system. In addition to Pan, Tilt and Intensity, the VL2 featured two colour wheels, with 16 positions each (15 dichroic filters plus one open position for white—see US Patent 4800474.) There was one (non-rotating) gobo wheel with 10 positions (9 gobos plus 1 open). The gobos could be easily swapped for custom designs—unlike the VL1. The gobos were mostly made from aluminium, fixed to a plastic stalk, but Vari-lite also developed a new type of glass gobo for use with the VL2 (see US Patent 4779176).

There were two other new beam functions: A beam iris to alter the diameter of the beam and a movable, multi-element front lens to sharpen or soften the beam edge.

The VL2 used an HTI-250 arc source, similar to that in the VL1, driven by an updated APS250 lamp power supply.

To this day, few—if any—automated spot luminaires, have been able to match the speed of colour and gobo change achieved by the Vari-lite VL2 and its direct descendants.

As with all Vari-lite products, the VL2 range was subject to a rolling programme of improvements and retrofits, designed to increase the reliability of what was still, in many ways, cutting-edge technology. In particular, the design of the original APS lamp power supply was notoriously unreliable but was ultimately cured by the application of the "X-mod" upgrade, which—with additional tweaks to the lamp ignitor card—vastly reduced the number of APS-related and lamp strike problems. Upgraded APS units were suffixed with "-X".

The VL2B saw the light source upgraded to a HTI-400SE, short arc discharge lamp, driven by the upgraded APS400 PSU. A very pale blue dichroic filter was replaced with 3200K tungsten correction and the beam iris motor replaced with one of a higher resolution. VL2B luminaires can be distinguished by the absence of ventilation louvres on the rear panel of the head; which were replaced by a hinged panel, through which to access the new lamp base for bulb changes and line-up.

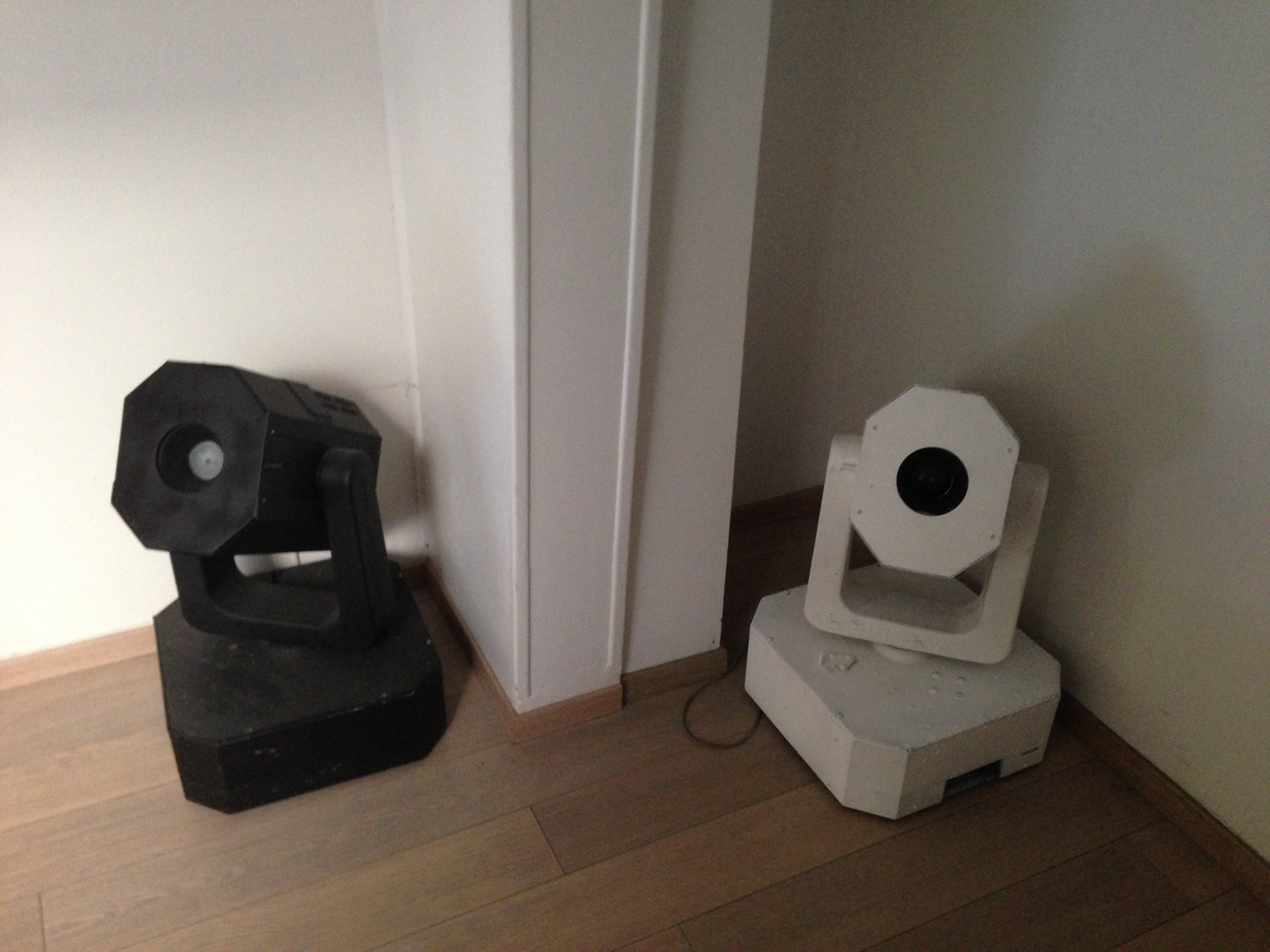
VL2C

The VL2C further upgraded the light source to 600 W, driven by an APS600-X lamp PSU. The internal ventilation system was accordingly redesigned to better cool the head—especially the colour / gobo wheels and the beam iris leaves were upgraded for better heat resistance. The speed of the cooling fan was also increased—which led to some complaints (especially from TV studios) about noise. Detachable, external baffles were designed to cover the ventilation grilles in the side of the luminaire's Upper Enclosure (UPE), in order to deal with this issue; but could occasionally cause overheating in warm environments, leading to lamp shutdown.

The VL2C also featured an upgraded processor board, to better handle the demands made by extra features offered in later versions of the Series 200 operating system software, such as the application of timing values (rather than a simple speed) to the various functions. The VL2C can be outwardly distinguished by the presence of ventilation louvres to the rear of the top and bottom head covers and by a smaller, hinged colour / gobo access hatch, secured by a quarter-turn Zeus clip (previous versions featured a sliding hatch).

In the late 1990s, a modification was applied to the VL2C, which allowed it to be controlled from DMX512 lighting consoles, via a Vari-lite Smart DMX unit. In the UK, the remaining VL2Cs were eventually sold off to various lighting rental companies. Some may still be in existence, other than any kept for exhibition / archive units; but the difficulty of sourcing spare parts means that a significant hire stock is unlikely to be maintained in the long term.

VL2D: With the end of production of the 600HTI lamp, some vl2C was converted by EML/PRG with 700MSR lamp.

==== VL3 ====
The Vari-lite VL3 was the company's first attempt to create a moving head wash luminaire, designed overall to light larger areas of a stage with softer-edged beams of light; in contrast with the tighter, often hard-edged beams produced by spot luminaires. The VL3 was built to complement the VL2 spot luminaire and released at the same time, in 1987, as a part of the (then) new Series 200 system. Externally, the luminaire was of an identical size and design to the VL2, save for the presence of a larger (6" / 150 mm), convex, slightly frosted lens—its key distinguishing feature. A wider range of lenses, with a variety of beam angles mimicking those found in PAR64 lamps, had been originally planned, but was not implemented on the VL3. The idea was later revived for the VL5.

Internally, the VL3 marked a return to the original idea of using twisting dichroic filters, to gradually vary the colour of the beam (see US Patent 4602321). This was made practical by the simpler optics employed in a wash luminaire, which do not produce the same beam artifacts that the optics of a spot luminaire would, using this type of colour change mechanism. The subtractive, CMY (Cyan Magenta Yellow) colour mixing system designed for the VL3, featured three sets of three dichroic filters, each set independently rotatable; with the cyan filters at the rear, closest to the lamp and the magenta filters to the front. In their "open" position, the filters sat edge-on to the axis of the light beam, so that only white light emerged. By rotating the filter sets into the path of the beam, a wide variety of colours could be created—from light pastel shades, to deep saturated hues.

A similar mechanism, with three, frosted glass vanes in place of dichroic filters, sat in front of the colour mechanism and was used to provide variable beam diffusion / width control, from a narrow spot to a wide flood. Further beam width control was introduced, with the motorisation of the lamp base; which allowed it to be moved through the reflector, along the beam axis.

Another, major departure from the VL1 and VL2, was the use of a custom-made, tungsten lamp as the light source, which ran at a maximum of 53 volts and consumed 475 Watts. This was dimmed by a new type of lamp power supply—the IPS, with I standing for Induction, instead of Arc.

Despite allowing lighting designers and programmers to create the kind of gradual colour changes and soft-edged washes which were unachievable with the VL1 and VL2, the VL3 was not a long-term success; mainly due to the tungsten lamp not being bright enough to handle longer throws, especially when set in darker colours. This compromised its ability to provide frontal illumination, reducing its role to mostly backlighting and beam effects. The VL3 began to be replaced by the VL4 from 1991. There may be a one or two left in existence, for exhibition / archive purposes, but the vast majority had been converted to VL2B luminaires by the end of 1994, which in turn were later upgraded to VL2Cs.

A large number of VL3 luminaires can be seen surrounding the central, circular screen, in videos of Pink Floyd's Delicate Sound of Thunder tour.

==== VL4 ====
Marketed under the strapline, Smaller, Lighter, Faster, Brighter, the Vari-lite VL4 was the company's second moving head wash luminaire, designed to replace and improve upon the VL3. It was first made available for rental in 1990.

At roughly half the size and weight of its predecessor, the VL4 did much to address market concerns regarding the size and weight of moving lights in general. A customised 400W short arc discharge lamp, updated from the one employed in the VL2B and coupled with a chemically brightened aluminium reflector, ensured that the output far exceeded that of the disappointing VL3.

The subtractive, CMY colour change mechanism was a reduced-size version of the one used in the VL3, but beam diffusion was handled by a tambour-inspired design; with motor-driven, vertical slats of increasingly diffuse glass, that were drawn (internally) across the front end of the luminaire from both sides (see US Patent No. 4972306). As with the VL3, further beam width control was achieved by moving the motorised lamp back and forth inside the reflector, along the beam axis.

Intensity control was provided via a mechanical shutter (the discharge lamp being non-dimmable). A second, "strobe" shutter, designed to snap open and closed as fast as possible, was incorporated into the intensity mechanism.

The VL4 also featured a 12-bit Motorola processor, over the 8-bit one used in the VL2 and VL3.

Despite being a technical improvement over the VL3, the small size and compact design of the VL4 led to a number of reliability issues—particularly with overheating. The densely constructed and relatively front-heavy head of the luminaire was also prone to overshooting (and then bouncing back to) its intended position at the end of fast movements. Many problems were addressed in a major upgrade programme, carried out over several weeks in the early 1990s, which featured over 135 modifications to the design. These ranged from the simple placement of a blob of rubber sealant somewhere in the luminaire, to the wholesale stripping down, extensive modification and total rebuilding of the Pan and Tilt mechanisms, to combat the overshooting problem.

The new, compacted design of the APS400 lamp power supply suffered similar problems to the earlier APS power supplies, although these were mostly cured with the eventual application of the "X-mod".

Ultimately, the small size of the luminaire made it impossible to upgrade the light source to a brighter, 600 Watt lamp (as had been done with the VL2C upgrade). Increasingly bright, competing luminaires from rival manufacturers, coupled with continuing reliability issues and high maintenance costs, saw the VL4 largely replaced by the VL5 within a decade of the latter's release. Very few remained in service beyond the first years of the 21st century and fewer still are in existence today, except maybe a couple held for exhibition / archive purposes. One complete VL4 and VL2C are held by Lighting & Sound Services.

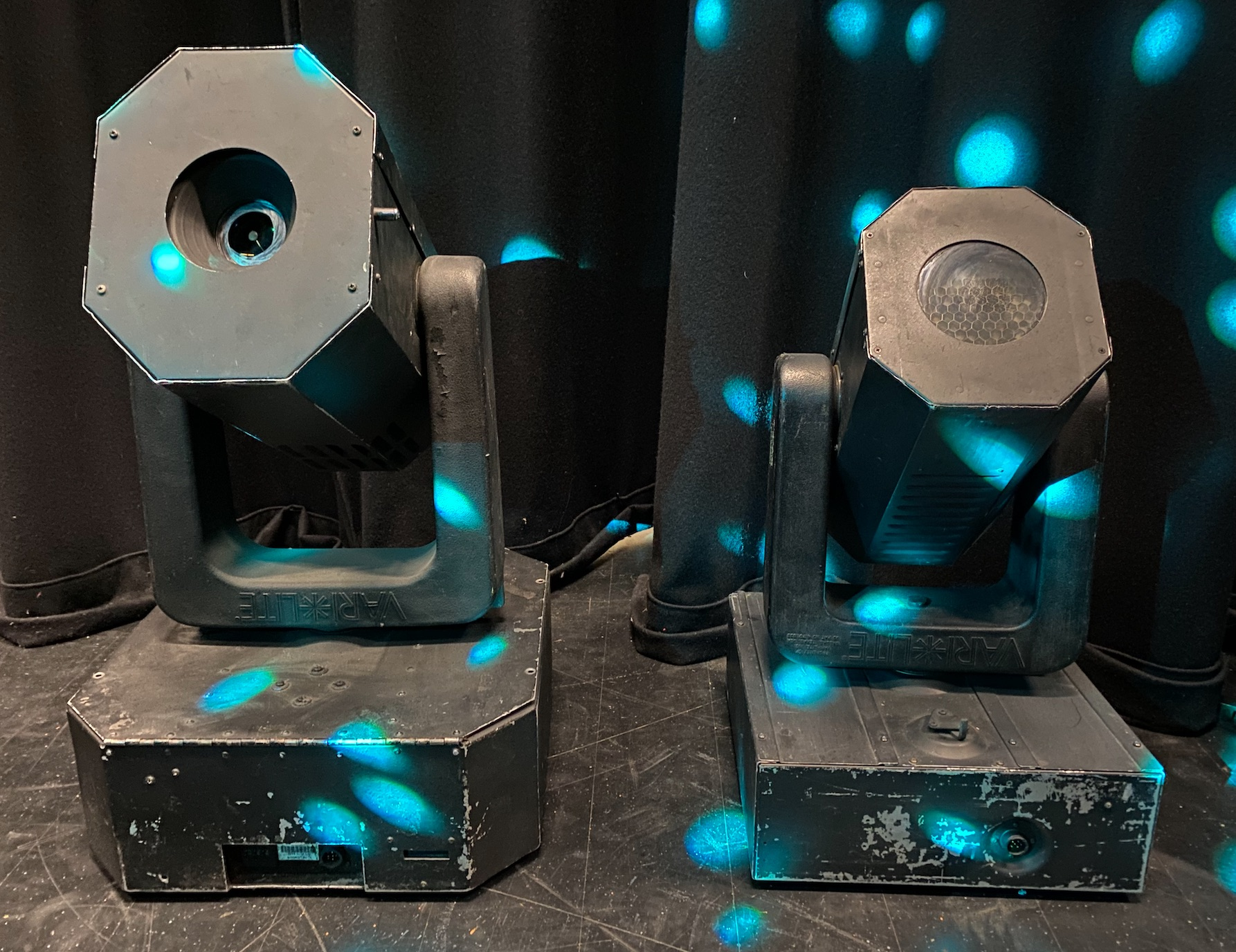
VL2C and VL4 Luminaries on display

=== Series 300 luminaires ===
==== VL5 / VL5 ARC / VL5B / VL5+ / VL5L / VL5 LED wash ====
The VL5 was the third moving head wash luminaire to be produced by Vari-lite and was released in September 1992. It uses the Dichro-Tune radial CMY color mixing system (see US Patents 5073847 and 5186536). This system gives smoother transitions between colours and more even pastel shades, than that used in the VL3 and VL4; but is slower in end-to-end travel and gives the fixture the unmistakable black dot at the front of the fixture. A fourth set of vanes carry diffused glass to soften / widen the beam. Unlike the VL4, there is no other beam control; although the native beam angle can be pre-set using interchangeable lenses, which mimic the beam angles found in PAR64 lamps (an idea first proposed for the VL3).

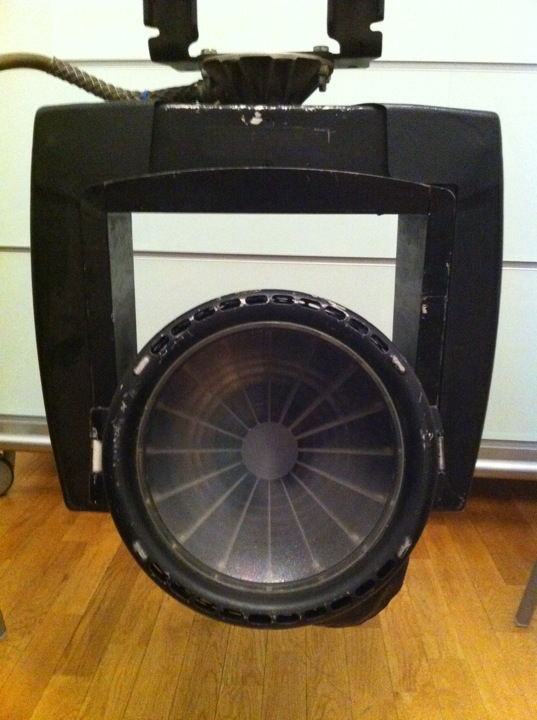
A version of the VL5

Design-wise, the VL5 responded to calls from entertainment lighting designers, for lighter, simpler, more reliable and (above all) cheaper moving light technology, which did not have to be controlled by a proprietary console. It was the first Series 300 luminaire, which could be controlled by either Vari-lite Series 200 data, or DMX512-A data, via a Vari-lite Smart Repeater (VLSR) box.

Whichever data type was used, the mains voltage tungsten lamp used in the VL5 is dimmed remotely; using standard, stage lighting dimmer technology. This considerably reduced the cost of the luminaire and removed the need for a large upper enclosure, it being possible to incorporate the remaining electronics in the yoke of the unit. The lamp itself was an updated design by Philips, strengthened to withstand the forces on the white-hot filament caused by high-speed movement of the head.

The VL5 was the first moving light to use "cold mirror" technology to provide a cool, high-intensity light beam, which could be placed close to objects and people, without burning them. The VL5s reflector is, in fact, a very large dichroic filter, which only allows infra-red light to pass through it, while reflecting the remaining visible light forward. The idea had been in use for some time before, most notably in MR16 halogen downlighter lamps, but never scaled up to this level. The prototype VL5 cold mirror reflector allegedly cost US$100,000 to produce. The idea works well in producing a cool beam output, but can raise the rear end of the head to flesh-searing temperatures, after just a few minutes' operation at maximum intensity.

The VL5 was the first convection-cooled moving light, requiring no fan and therefore producing almost no noise. This has made it a popular choice for television lighting and other noise-sensitive applications.

The VL5 Arc introduced a 575W discharge lamp to the design. As this could not be electronically dimmed, the diffuser vanes were replaced with black metal ones, which acted as a mechanical dimmer. Beam width control was initially carried out using an innovative "Liquid Lens"—again designed by Jim Bornhorst (see US Patent 5774273)—which pumped a liquid silica-based gel into a series of lentil-shaped cavities, set between two plastic membranes—thus altering their refractive index and giving a variable beam angle of 13–34°. However, this range fell short of that originally promised in the R&D stage and was not generally wide enough, to be useful for creating the kind of broad washes of soft-edged light, normally expected by users from this class of luminaire. The liquid lens fell further out of favour, after some users obtained the MSDS for the gel being used in the lens and expressed concerns at its potential toxicity. Following this, many VL5 Arcs were rented out without the liquid lens, using instead the same, fixed-focus range of lenses designed for the original VL5.

The original VL5 had offered a wider range of green shades than the VL4, but enabling it to do so had compromised its ability to produce pale, daylight and "steel" shades of blue—which are more useful to lighting designers, especially those working in Theatre and TV. The VL5B featured an alternative filter set, which restored the ability to produce pale blues, but reduced the overall number of useful colours available—especially darker, more saturated shades in the blue-green range. As a result, the VL5B is mostly used in Theatre and TV productions, where its specialised colour range is more often specifically required. The VL5B uses the same, 1000W tungsten lamp as the original VL5, powered by remote dimmers.

The VL5 has been Vari-lite's most long-lived product and is one of the most popular stage lighting units in the company's inventory, with over 3,500 built.

VL5 Arc+ / VL5+

In 2008, PRG performed an upgrade of the original Series 300 VL5 luminaire, similar to those upgrades to create the VL6C+, creating the VL5+ luminaire. This included several upgrades to enhance reliability and performance including replacement of wiring harness, upgraded motor clutches, improved pan stop, replacing linear actuators controlling the colour mixing and diffusion blades, new upgraded yoke leg covers, improved UV glass, better ventilation, more efficient reflector and new Dichro*Tune colour blades to allow for more consistent colour between luminaries. The VL5 Arc was also given the "+" treatment with a new solid state ignitor reducing re-strike time to 1 minute and a lamp douse switch on the fixture itself.

VL5 LED

In November 2019 the VL5 LED wash was presented.

VL5L / PRG 5L

In 2022 PRG created the PRG 5L Wash luminaire. This is an LED retrofit using the original VL5 luminaire housing thus keeping the iconic look of the luminaire but bringing it in to the modern era. The rear of the 'lamped' fixture has been removed and replaced with a 340W RGBW LED engine. Most of the legacy centre of the luminaire has been removed, leaving only the diffusion blades, behind which sits a fresnel lens. The diffusion blades are still functional.

The luminaire has 16-bit RGBW colour control, and due to the LED technology, offers a strobe effect for the first time.

The luminaire is true DMX control; it does not require a Smart Repeater. This has been achieved by fitting a very small upper enclosure which houses connections for DMX in and through, and True1 power in and through. The side of the upper enclosure is so small that the luminaire retains the baseless look of the original VL5. A small colour screen is set in to the yoke leg which allows you to set the DMX address of the fixture. The luminaire uses 23 control channels.

A quick release truss hook plate attaches to the upper enclosure. This can be removed and the luminaire floor mounted by pulling out 4 feet which are built in to the upper enclosure.

The PRG 5L Wash is an LED retrofit of the VL5, preserving the appearance of the original while providing a near-silent wash luminaire for the LED era.

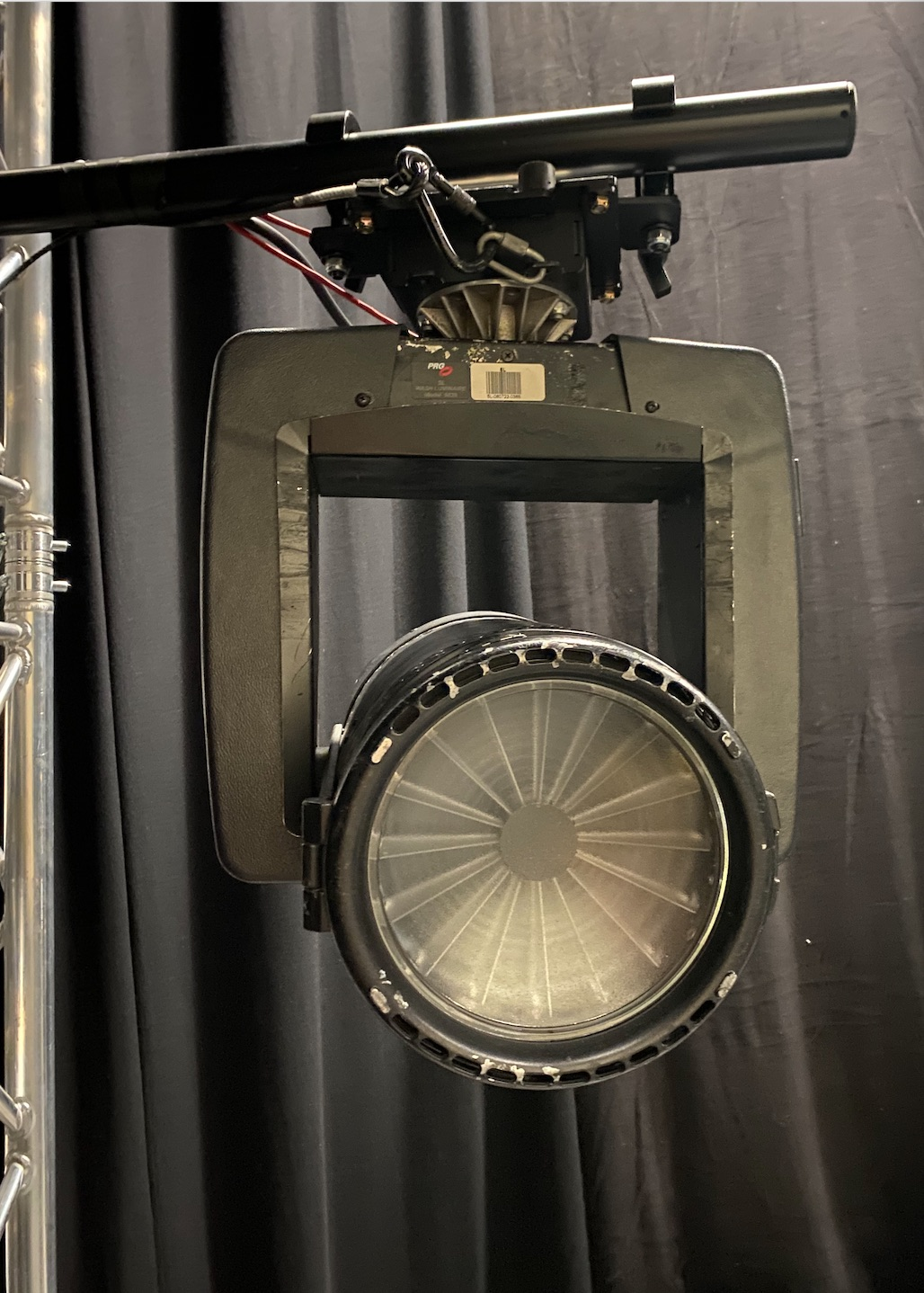
A PRG 5L luminaire hung on a boom arm from truss on a show in 2023.

==== VL6 / VL6B / VL6C / VL6C Plus ====
The Vari-lite VL6 was designed to complement the VL5, as a simple, lightweight, cheap-to-hire, moving head spot luminaire; but did not appear on the market until mid-1994—almost two years after the VL5. As a Series 300 luminaire, it could be controlled either by Vari-lite Series 200 data or DMX512, via a Vari-lite Smart Repeater (VLSR) unit.

The unusual "cyclops" design carried just two wheels: one for colour and one for gobos, each with 12 positions (including 1 open). The dichroic filters and gobos in the VL6 were interchangeable between the two wheels. With gobos set in both wheels and placed in the beam path, it is possible to "morph" between them, by adjusting the focus of the motorised lens (See US Patent No. 5934794). Placing dichroic filters in both wheels, allows additional colours to be created beyond the basic palette afforded by a single wheel, although this potential has not been widely explored.

A new process of laser-etching very high resolution designs, onto the very small glass gobos designed for the VL6, was developed and patented by Vari-lite (see US Patent No. 5728994).

A custom HTI-400 discharge lamp was once again chosen for the light source, requiring mechanical dimming and fans to cool the head of the luminaire; although these were smaller and considerably quieter, than those used in previous luminaires. As with the VL5, a dichroic, "cold mirror" was used as the reflector. Like the VL5, the VL6 had no upper enclosure and a new, modular, rack-mounted version of the APS power supply (the APS6) was designed to remotely power the lamps, via VLSRs. Six APS6 units could be mounted in one rack at a time.

A dimmer dimmer module (the C3) with the same overall form as the APS6 was also designed, with the intention of allowing the lamps of VL5s and VL6s to be powered together, from the same lamp PSU rack, via a common VLSR. However, in Europe, the limitations of the C3 circuitry meant that insufficient voltage could be produced, to raise the 230 V version of the VL5 lamp to its maximum possible intensity; leaving the output looking dim and yellow. There was also the potential for accidental connection of VL6 lamps to dimmed mains supplies on "mixed" VLSRs, which rendered the lamps instantly and permanently useless. As a result, VL5 lamps continued to be mostly driven by third party dimmers and VL6s by APS racks, with the two types of luminaire usually running on separate VLSRs.

The lightweight design of the VL6, meant that much faster moves were possible than with previous Vari-lite spots; although this was compromised by the weight added in the VL6B upgrade.

Performed in 1998, the VL6B upgrade added a wider aperture zoom lens, with a 13−35° range and an additional rotating gobo wheel, with 5+1 positions. This added considerable weight to the head of the luminaire and made it front-heavy, to the extent that a counterweight was required to provide balance and bolted to the outside of the rear of the head.

The VL6C upgraded the light source to 600 W, with commensurate measures taken to improve head cooling, heat resistance and to upgrade the APS6 lamp power supplies.

In December 2007, The Production Resource Group (PRG) completed an upgrade of their entire stock of 1,200 VL6C luminaires to accept a 700W short arc discharge lamp. Modifications to the airflow system were made to improve the reliability of circuit boards and motors, with upgraded wiring and connectors for all motors and pan/tilt mechanisms. Improvements to the ignitor reduced the hot restrike time from 8 minutes to 1 minute and a new lamp douse switch was fitted, to allow lamp power to be disconnected at the luminaire itself. This upgraded version of the VL6C is referred to as the VL6C Plus.

==== VLM ====
The VLM was a double-sided mirror mounted in a VL5 yoke, with the added twist that the mirror could spin continuously. Partially developed to counter the moving mirror effects of being able to produce a fat beam, and partly as a unique lighting effect, it was produced in limited numbers.

==== VL7 / VL7B ====
The VL7 spot luminaire marked a return to a much larger design. As a Series 300 luminaire, it could be controlled by either Series 200 data from an Artisan console, or DMX512 data from a third party lighting console, via a VLSR unit. The Philips MSR 700 SA lamp, with a colour temperature of 5600K, was chosen for the light source and driven remotely, from newly upgraded APS6 lamp power supplies.

In keeping with its predecessors, the VL7 featured a number of innovations. First and foremost (at least from a marketing point of view) was the CVF colour system. This featured neither wheels nor twisting filters, but rather a pair of comparatively large, oblong, dichroic filter plates, which could be moved in the vertical and horizontal plane. Each plate carried three basic shades, carefully graduated to merge across the longer, horizontal plane. In the vertical plane, the three basic shades were progressively etched away with lasers, so that they were fully saturated at the top, but completely clear at the bottom. One filter plate carried the colours red, green and blue; while the other carried cyan, magenta and yellow. US Patent Nos. 5825548 and 5969868 describe the concepts behind the CVF colour system. Both patents make mention of a colour wheel and a fixed position wheel was included in the finished luminaire. This could carry both colours and/or gobos, but was mostly used for the latter. There was also a rotating gobo wheel, with a total of six positions and a strobe shutter, which could run at up to 7.25 Hz.

A further, more subtle innovation, saw the use of a new, collection optics system, that guaranteed a much flatter and more even beam than had been produced by previous Vari-lite luminaires, which were prone to "hot spots" if not set up correctly. The ideas behind this component of the VL7 were described in US Patent No. 6123436

The quest for optical excellence continued with the near projection-quality zoom lens; which featured an unprecedented 8:1 ratio, in the shape of a 5–40° beam angle range—a feature made more remarkable, by its highly compact design (see US Patent No. 6046861).

Despite these innovations and Vari-lite's previous experience, development of the VL7 was fraught with problems; originally unveiled in 1997, it was not released onto the market until 1998. Behind schedule, over-budget and not fully tested, the initial run of VL7 luminaires immediately fell victim to a wide range of teething troubles, for which—in most cases—there was no immediate cure. This left technicians only able to replace failed parts, rather than fix the problems which were causing them to fail. For example: a problem in the CVF, which caused the teeth to soften and become stripped from the belts that drove the filter plates, was traced to their drive gears, which had been made of a material with a high Specific Heat Capacity. Once this was understood, the gears could be changed, but not before several hundred belts had already required replacement. Further problems with the CVF caused cracks to appear in the (expensive) filter plates, although this did not always immediately affect the quality of the beam output.

Even when the CVF's mechanical bugs were cured, the fact remained that it often travelled through a range of green-coloured shades, in between the start and end colours of a change. Although all additive (RGB) or subtractive (CMY) will produce a tertiary colour—which may sometimes become visually dominant, in an aesthetically displeasing way—when cross-fading between a primary and secondary hue; it is always a product of and therefore more likely to harmonise with, the hues at the start and end of the colour change. Green was not regarded by users as a pleasant alternative to this and although a programming workaround was developed by operators, it was a time-consuming process to apply to multiple cues, that slowed down the speed of colour changes.

The luminaire had been released before the new, Series 200 software version required to control it from an Artisan was completely ready and—to begin with—it could only be controlled as a DMX luminaire, from a non-Vari-lite console.

Maintenance was complicated by the location of some sub-assemblies in the luminaire, the Pan unit proving especially difficult to replace.

The VL7 also featured more cooling fans than previous Vari-lite luminaires—a total of four and despite marketing claims of "virtually silent operation", the noise they produced did not go unnoticed by users.

The VL7B replaced the fixed colour / gobo wheel, with a four-leaf motorised shutter gate, which could be used to mask the edges of the beam and could be rotated by 50°. The maximum speed of the strobe shutter was also increased slightly, to 8 Hz.

The VL7 design was not a long-lasting success—certainly when compared to its Series 300 stablemates. Its unwieldy shape, size, weight and noisiness, plus the difficulty of maintenance and early unreliability, combined to make it unpopular with lighting technicians, operators and designers alike. By this time and despite Vari-lite's vigorous defence of their patents, there was a ready choice of alternatives available from competing manufacturers, which offered the same functions and brighter outputs. Many—if not most VL7s—were eventually returned to the VLPS agencies by sub-distributors and rental associates, to be hired only if specifically requested for a production.

=== Series 2000 luminaires ===
==== VL2000 Spot luminaire ====
Similar to the VL2416, the VL2000 spot series was available for outright purchase rather than rental only. The range began with the VL2201 spot fixture in the early 2000s.

VL2201

This was essentially a DMX version of the popular VL6b featuring an Upper Enclosure (UPE) housing the arc power supply for the MSR400 short arc lamp and low voltage supply for electronics and motors. The lightweight luminaire featured an 11+1 slot fixed gobo wheel, the same as the VL6 range, 5+1 slot rotating gobo wheel, edge control, 3:1 zoom, 11+1 slot colour wheel and single blade dimmer mechanism which could also function as a strobe.

Similar to early series 200 and 300 fixtures, the colour and gobo wheel speed is exceptionally fast allowing for effects that can't be achieved with other brands of spot fixture. Electronic focus allows for morphing between gobos.

The 2201 fixture has a smooth cold mirror reflector with lamp adjustment allowing for a flat or peaked beam.

VL2202

The VL2202 luminaire was very similar to the VL6c fixture. Specification was the same as the VL2201 except it featured a 19-35 degree 3:1 zoom range, a faceted cold mirror reflector for a perfectly flat beam, and a MSR700 short arc lamp for higher output. Vari Lite produced an upgrade kit for 2201 fixtures to allow them to be converted to 2202 fixtures

The VL2201 was discontinued and the VL2202 renamed as the "VL2000 Spot".

==== VL2000 Wash luminaire ====
The VL2000 Wash fixture began life as the VL2402. They were renamed as the VL2000 wash the same time as the spot range was renamed. The VL2000 wash is the same size and design as the spot range for a consistent hanging configuration across the range. The fixture features a MSR700 short arc lamp, the same exceptionally fast 11+1 slot colour wheel, as well as a three-wheel CYM colour mixing system to allow for a nearly unlimited range of colours. This more traditional wheel mixing system differs from the previous Vari Lite Dichro*Tune radial colour mixing system employed in the VL5 and VL2416 wash fixtures.

The fixture has a single blade dimmer system, which allows for strobe effects, as well as zoom optics for a 12 to 57 degree beam angle.

The VL2000 wash is a DMX only fixture.

The VL2000 range of fixtures are discontinued and replaced by the VL2500 range, which feature colour mixing on spot and wash, higher torque pan and tilt motors, and an improved glass dimming system.

Many service parts are compatible between the VL6 through to VL2500.

==== VL2416 Wash luminaire ====
Despite its numerical designation, this was the first new luminaire to be produced following the VL7 and hence became unofficially known as the "VL8" among American crews. The VL2416 marked a major sea-change in the Vari-lite business model, in that it was the first Vari-lite luminaire that could actually be purchased. Previous luminaires had (in)famously been available for rental only.

The head was closely based on that of the VL5 Arc, with radial CMY colour mixing and mechanical shutter dimming fast enough to also provide strobe effects.

The liquid lens was discarded and beam width controlled instead, by a new type of zoom optics(see US Patent 6809869). This uses two plates of glass; one with a surface covered in several dozen, small (<10 mm), convex lenses and the other moulded with corresponding, concave depressions, into which the lenses precisely fit. When the plates are brought together, they effectively form a flat piece of glass, through which light passes unaffected. Moving the plates apart increases the angle of the beam, producing a very wide range of angles (5–55° in this luminaire) over a very short range of travel (<25 mm)—leading to a compact design with rapid operation (1.2 seconds end-to-end). A similar system can be seen in operation on some, early 21st-century LED stage lighting fixtures, with a variable beam angle function.

As this was a self-contained luminaire, the Upper Enclosure (UPE) was restored to the design, to carry the lamp power supply and DMX related electronics.

The VL2416 could only be controlled with DMX data. There was no facility for control from a proprietary Vari-lite console.

==== VL2500 Spot luminaire ====
The VL2500 was an enhancement of the VL2000 range of luminaries offering better performance, however the VL2500 range shares more in common with the VL3000 than VL2000.

For the VL2500 spot, we retained features such as iris, zoom, and edge control. The same 11+1 fixed gobo wheel and 5+1 position rotating gobo wheel were the same as in the earlier VL2000 spot. The 11+1 colour wheel was also present allowing for those lighting fast colour bumps that Vari*Lite fixtures were renowned for, however this is where the similarity ends. The VL2500 spot offered full CYM colour mixing, a full range glass dimmer wheel, and a twin blade shutter for fast strobe effects - a marked improvement over the VL2000's single blade dimmer/shutter paddle. Pan and tilt motors had more torque over the VL2000 range.

The upper enclosure contained an arc power supply to drive the 700W MSR short-arc lamp, a low voltage power supply to drive the electronics, and a digital display LCD PCB. The control main control PCB was housed in the yoke leg, instead of being split like the main control PCB and Aux Cards found in the VL2000 range. The PCB was force cooled by a fan in the base of the yoke. The opposite yoke leg contained the mains relay, tilt motor and ignitor.

==== VL2500 Wash luminaire ====
The VL2500 Wash was physically identical to the Spot, offering zoom, dimming strobe, CYM colour mixing as well as the 11+1 fixed colour wheel found in the Spot.

The VL2500 range was replaced by the VL2600 range of LED based luminaries, which launched in 2017

=== Series 3000 luminaires ===
==== VL3000 Spot / VL3000Q Spot ====
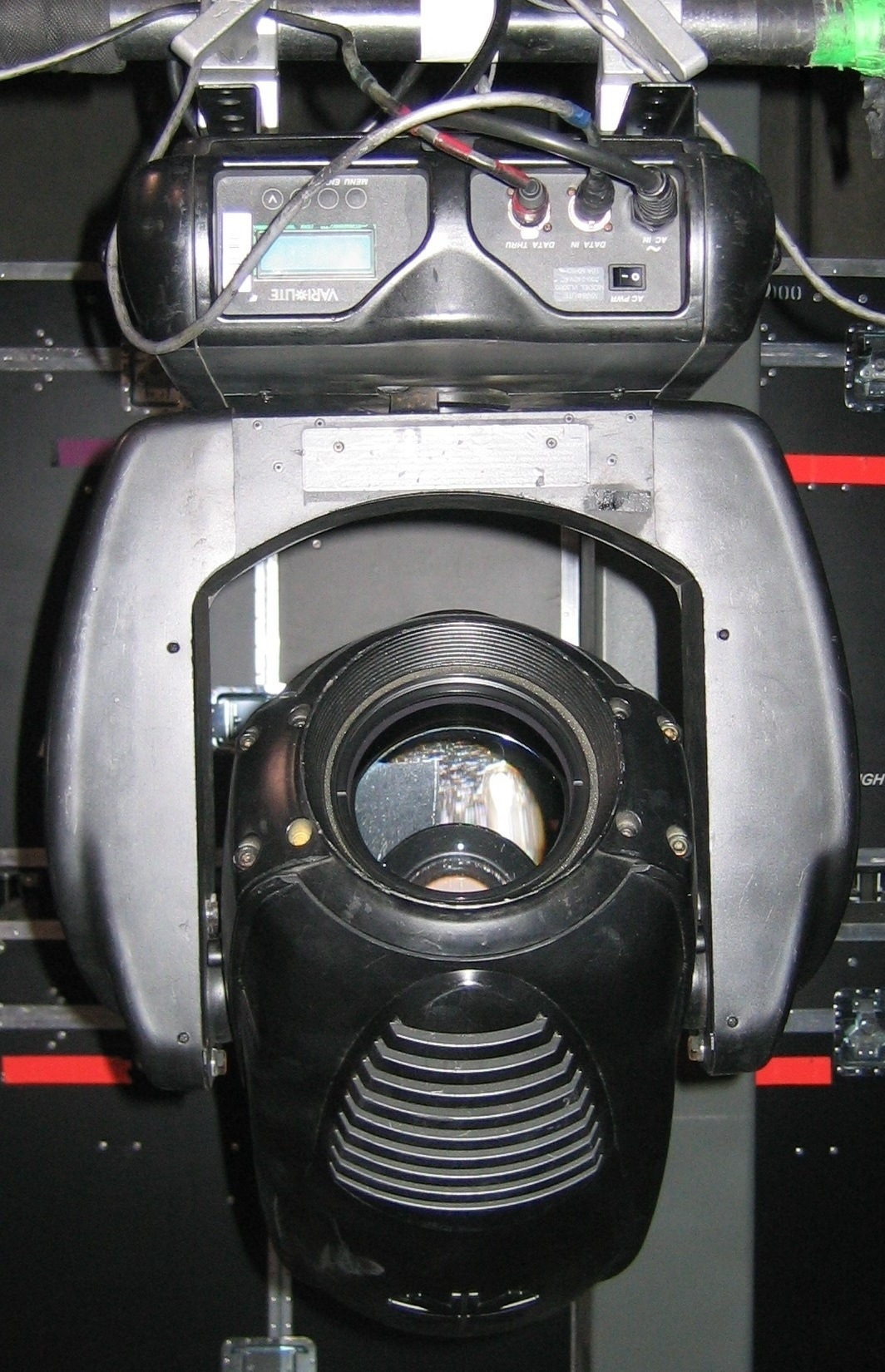
VL3000 Spot

==== VL3000 Spot / VL3500 Spot / VL3500Q/ VL3015/ VL3015LT Spot ====
The VL 3500 is similar to the 3000 series.

The VL3000 spot was a 1200W moving head luminaire. It featured many high-end features not seen in similar fixtures of the time - it offered 3 rotating, indexable gobo wheels, a huge 10 to 60 degree zoom, focus, full range dimming via a glass dimmer wheel, a fast dual blade strobe mechanism, a fixed interchangeable colour wheel, CYM colour mixing system as well as a variable CTO wheel. The lens system is housed in a closed metal box in an attempt to keep the optical path clean - all lenses are accessible by removing 3 screws to open the optical box.

The fixture has a single mode of 28 channels, and despite having a lot of alloy or plastic parts, weighs 41kg. Whilst it has handles built in to the UPE, the bulbous design of the head, with the lack of pan or tilt locks makes it difficult to maneouver without a second pair of hands.

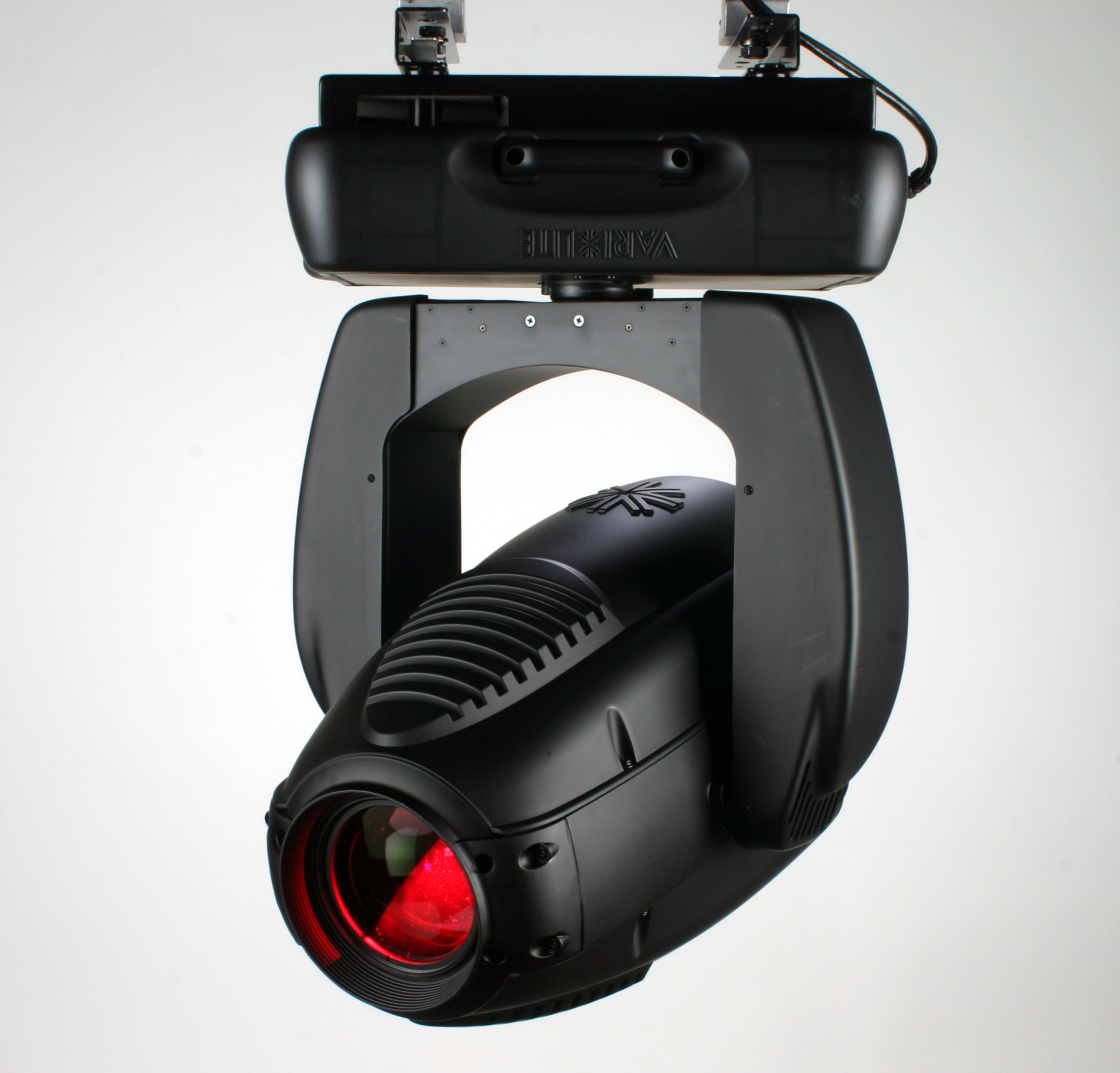
The VL3500-Spot (2003 to 2008)

=== VLX Series luminaires ===
==== VLX Wash ====
The VLX Wash is a light in the Philips-aera from 2010; it uses LED technology and is programmable.

== Other products and accessories ==
=== VLM ===
The VLM (Vari*Lite Mirror) was a result of a brainstorming session to try and solve the problems of never being able to offer every possible luminaire in an automated yoke. Vari-Lite designed a unit which was basically a two sided metal mirror mounted inside a Series 300 yoke. The tilt end stops were removed giving the unit the ability to spin continuously on that axis.

The units were used with much success on a series of Belgium TV shows where they were used in conjunction with a series of Robert Juliat 1200w profiles. However, a limited number of units were produced and they never became a mainstream product.

=== VLDi ===
The VLDi (Vari*Lite Dimmer interface) was a 96 channel 0–10 V analogue interface between a conventional dimmer unit and the Series 200 control system. Each unit took up 100 of the 1000 available control channels, which gave the Artisan control console considerable potential. However, in many cases at the time the lighting designer on a show and the Vari*Lite operator were different people, and so many designers opted to retain the conventional lighting console. As well as this, the Artisan had been designed to control moving lights and did not provide many of the tools that conventional lighting desk operators had come to use.

The final nail in the coffin for the VLDi was the mass migration of the lighting industry to the DMX512 protocol.

The "i" in the VLDi acronym is still generally included in all verbal and written communications referring to the product. This is done to avoid potential confusion with the initials of Vari-lite Deutschland (VLD).

=== Mini ACS Rack ===
The mini-ACS rack is a small rack mount version of the ACS rack. Unit features:

+ Provides 17 channels of power and signal.
+ Provides one trunk run output and eight powered lamp cable outputs.
+ Can be used as master or slave rack in large systems.

House power connects to the mini-ACS rack through an 8/5 cable with Hubbell connectors, connected from a mini-AC line disconnect. Two other power cables are available for connection: Hubbell plug connector to bare pigtails and Epic plug connector to Hubbell receptacle connector.

=== Smart DMX ===
Introduced to replace the obsolete VLDi, the Vari-lite Smart DMX unit converted Series 200 data into DMX512 data, allowing control over conventional, third-party dimmers, from Vari-lite's proprietary Artisan console. This was used mainly to control dimmers which were powering the lamps of VL5, but also to control "conventional" portions of stage lighting systems, without the need (and cost) of a second console and operator.

=== UDM ===
An upgrade to the Smart DMX, the UDM allowed Artisan Plus consoles to patch and control third party moving fixtures via DMX-512. It allowed control of up to 64 fixtures on a single universe per UDM.

=== Floyd Droid ===
A custom-built effects unit, designed for Pink Floyd's Delicate Sound of Thunder tour. Four were built and respectively nicknamed Manny, Moe, Jack, and Cloyd. They featured arrays of motor-driven mirrors, and (mostly) scanned multiple, tight beams of light over the audience; while avoiding potential hazards to vision, associated with producing such effects using high-power lasers.

== Irideon Inc. ==
=== History ===
Irideon, Inc. was a subsidiary company formed by Vari-lite in 1994, to target the architectural lighting market by offering colour-changing luminaires, able to dramatically illuminate buildings and outdoor structures in ways which—until then—could only be imagined.

Two Irideon luminaires were initially produced: The AR500 and the AR5.

Irideon Inc. was sold to Electronic Theatre Controls (ETC) in November 1998; as a result of the difficult conditions experienced by Vari-lite, during their first year of trading on the stock market. Under ETC's stewardship, the AR50 was completed and a two new luminaires—the AR6 and AR250—were created.

Manuals for some Irideon luminaires are still available from ETC.

=== Irideon Luminaires ===
In chronological order:

==== AR500 ====
A large, metal-cased luminaire, designed for outdoor use and finished in a grey powder coat.

The Pan and Tilt functions were not motorised, so the luminaire should perhaps not be considered as a true moving light.

Colours were created using the same, radial DICHRO*TUNE mechanism that had been developed for the VL5. As with the VL5, there was also a set of diffuser vanes to alter the beam width. A further set of black metal vanes were used to control intensity, as the luminaire employed a 500W discharge lamp as a light source, driven by an internal lamp power supply.

==== AR5 ====
A much smaller luminaire, with a head approximately 300mm in length, available in a black or white finish and designed for indoor use. All functions were motorised, including Pan and Tilt, making the AR5 a true moving light.

Colour, Intensity and Diffusion were handled by miniaturised versions of the mechanisms used in the AR500, using just eight vanes per set, instead of sixteen.

The light source was a 35W discharge lamp, powered from an internal supply.

==== AR6 ====
A recessed, non-moving version of the AR5. Mounted inside a case designed to fit within the area of a standard ceiling tile and intended for use in downlight applications.

==== AR50 ====
A larger version of the AR5, with all functions motorised. Development was apparently begun under Vari-lite ownership of Irideon and completed by ETC.

==== AR250 / AR250C ====
A smaller version (plus variant) of the original AR500, with non-motorised Pan and Tilt and a 250W discharge light source.
