= American Society of Theatre Consultants =

The American Society of Theatre Consultants (ASTC) is a professional organization whose main goal is to apprise owners, contractors and/or architects of the services that a theatre consultant can perform, whether it be for a new or renovated facility.

== Settings of work ==
The types of facilities that an ASTC member is qualified to assist with are:

- Theatres: professional & commercial, regional, universities, colleges, high schools and community
- Auditoriums
- Concert Halls
- Arenas
- Stadiums
- Churches
- Multi-use performance facilities (for theatre, dance, concerts, opera, etc.)
- Corporate theatres, board rooms, and presentation & conference rooms
- Showrooms

== Theatre consultant definition ==
A theatre consultant, hired by either the contractor, architect or owner, is a professional who with their vast knowledge of layouts, codes and functions of theatre and performance spaces are there to advise owners and design teams during the planning and building of the project. ASTC members must be well versed in technical criteria such as:

- stage layout and specifications (also see Parts of a theatre)
- fly system and rigging
- mechanical systems such as turntables, orchestra pit lifts, etc.
- theater drapes and stage curtains
- seating and sightlines
- stage lighting equipment and lighting positions
- audio systems
- acoustics
- video projection criteria
- dressing room specifications
- loading docks
- front of house
- building and safety codes
- Americans with Disabilities Act (ADA)

== Background ==
The American Society of Theatre Consultants has a current membership of 80 individuals representing 31 theatre consulting offices. Their members have worked on venues such as: the Walt Disney Concert Hall in Los Angeles, CA, the Santa Fe Opera in Santa Fe, NM, the Robert and Magrit Mondavi Center for the Performing Arts at the University of California, Davis, the Jay Pritzker Pavilion at Millennium Park, Chicago, IL, the Chicago Shakespeare Theater, Jenison Center for the Arts in Jenison, MI, Music City Center in Nashville, TN, Red Skelton Performing Arts Center in Vincennes, IN, and the Conference Center in Salt Lake City, UT.

With the complexity of designing performance spaces and the need to keep apprised of the multitude of codes and new technologies, ASTC has two meetings a year to discuss and review the newest evolutions in public performance spaces. These meetings are held throughout the United States so members can see first-hand the newest facilities their fellow members have designed. Included in these meetings are panel discussions, often with invited authorities on various topics. Past Forum topics include:

- Programming and Planning for the 21st Century
- The Artistic Side of Theatre Planning
- Acousticians
- Facilities for Dance
- Casino Theatres
- Outdoor Theatres
- Rooms for Music
- Front of House Design Issues

With the constant changes to building and safety codes, the ASTC has been heavily involved in the creation, dissemination and implementation of those codes.

== Allied organizations ==
The ASTC maintains close ties with similar organizations such as: United States Institute for Theatre Technology (USITT), the International Association of Venue Managers (IAVM), and the Entertainment Services and Technology Association (ESTA).

== See also ==
- The Institute of Theatre Consultants, a similar organisation founded in 1964.
