= Theatre consultant =

A theatre consultant is a consultant who specializes in the design of facilities for the performing arts, equipment for those facilities and the operation of theatre.

Professional consultants provide unbiased, functionally sound, practical consulting and design services for performance and public assembly facilities of all kinds. Owners and architects use their expertise to programme, plan and help with the construction of these kinds of complicated buildings. Their professional organization in North America is the American Society of Theatre Consultants. The international equivalent organisation is the Institute of Theatre Consultants. There are also many theatre consultants that are not members of these organisations. Unlike the practice of architecture or engineering, theatre consulting is not regulated by professional license, but the Institute of Theatre Consultants accredits theatre consultants on the basis of proven work, operates a Code of Practice and provides training to members. To attain membership in the American Society of Theatre Consultants (ASTC), individuals must have derived their principal income from theatre consulting for a minimum period of five years prior to application and have completed at least five substantial projects as a theatre consultant, must demonstrate professional practice consistent with the ASTC's Code of Ethics, and are prohibited from working as an owner, employee or commission agent for any firm that manufactures, sells or installs equipment or that acts as a contractor for the construction of performance, assembly or studio facilities ("Prohibition against Commercial Affiliation.")

Consultants are generally expert in building codes and the requirements of the American with Disabilities Act as related to theatres, auditoria, and concert halls. They typically provide detailed design for special theatre systems such as performance lighting systems, stage rigging, orchestra pit lifts, seating (fixed and movable), acoustical canopies and more. Some theatre consulting firms also provide acoustical and/or audio-visual consulting, although those are specialties in their own right.

Theatre consultants may work directly for a facility or organisation, or they may be contracted as a specialty consultant for a project architect or engineer. Services can range from programmatic planning for the development of new facilities, planning for the refurbishment or repurposing of existing facilities, or just (re)design or assessment of specific production systems.
