= Gareth Owen (sound designer) =

British theatre sound designer (born 1979)

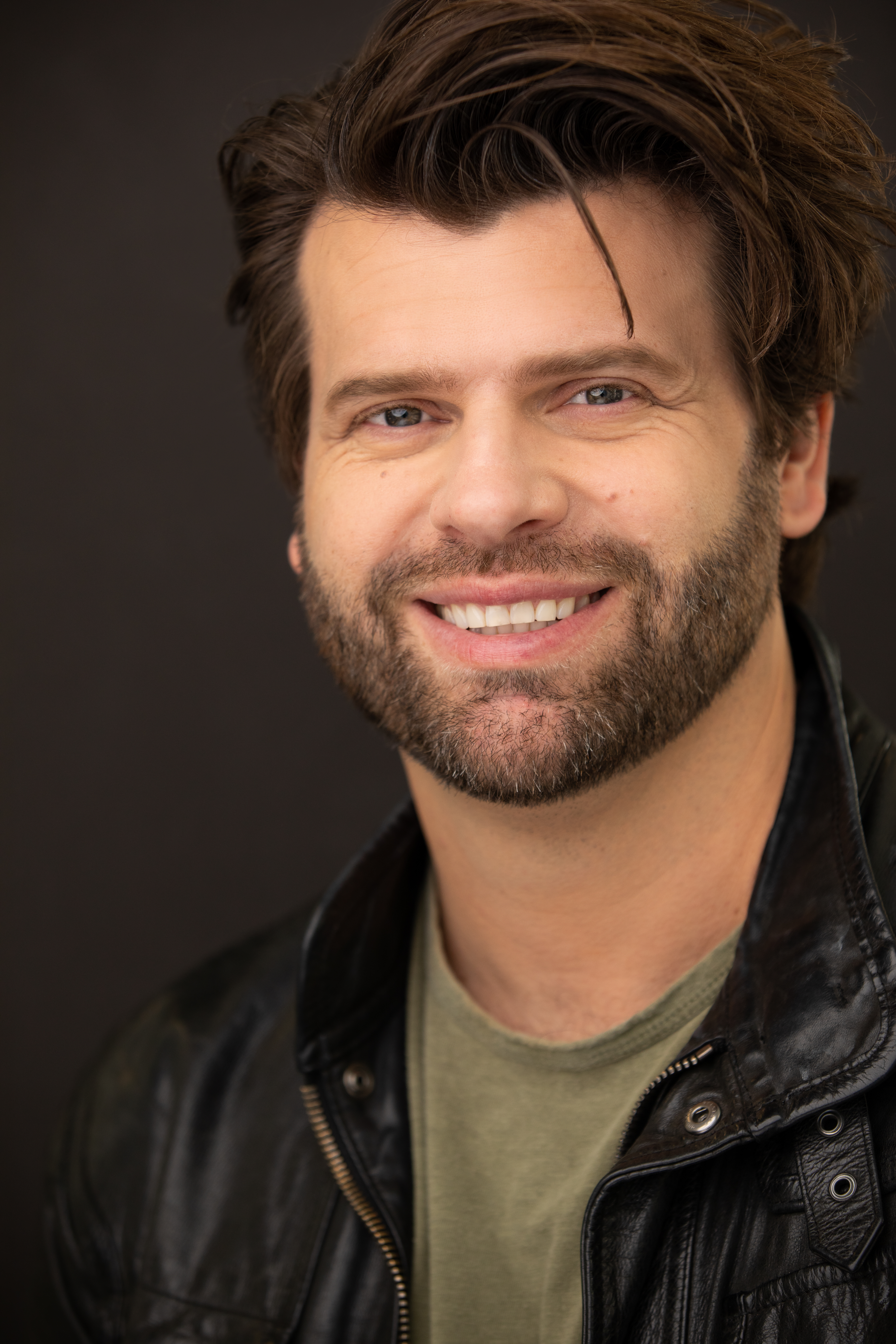
- Born: Gareth John Owen; 20 August 1979 (age 47); Sheffield, England
- Education: University of Plymouth (BA)
- Occupation: Theatrical Sound Designer
- Years active: 1998–present
- Spouse: Carmen Bierens
- Children: 3
- Website: www.garethowensound.com

Gareth Owen is a thirteen-time Tony & Olivier award-winning / nominated Broadway and West End sound designer, described as "one of the only behind-the-scenes creatives whose star wattage spells success for theatrical productions". He is quoted as saying, "Bad sound kills good theatre."

== Early life ==
Gareth John Owen was born in Sheffield, England, a son of two teachers, both of whom specialised in special needs education. At the age of nine the family moved to the Cayman Islands where Owen attended Cayman Islands Middle School. Upon returning to the UK the family moved to St. Ives in Cornwall where Owen attended both Mounts Bay School and Penwith Sixth Form College before going to the University of Plymouth in Plymouth, to study for a bachelor's degree in underwater science. While at university he worked in nightclubs as a lighting and sound engineer, and as a boatman and beach lifeguard in St. Ives, before eventually dropping out in his final year to go on tour with a rock band.

== Career ==
Owen, described as "Broadway's wizard of sound" began his career in live sound when the Penzance nightclub he was working at began presenting live bands which Owen was asked to mix. From here he secured work with Birmingham's SSE Audio Group which lead to an early career in rock & roll, working at festivals such as Glastonbury, Reading, Party in the Park, and T4 on the Beach; and mixing acts such as Def Leppard, The Stereophonics, B B King, Bon Jovi, Jules Holland, S Club 7, The Spice Girls and The Rolling Stones. In a 2024 Broadway Buzz interview he says "My very first job was hauling huge, heavy mains cables through knee-deep mud at festival fields and dragging delay speakers across two hundred meters of sludge and piss and old cigarette butts."

Owens theatre career began when he was invited to mix the musical The Blues Brothers which was running at what is now the Trafalgar Studios in Londons west end. About this time, Owen is quoted as saying "I didn't have a lot of money so I bought a tent and lived in the band's garden". From here he was offered a job as sound designer for the UK tour of Wicked composer Stephen Schwartz' musical Godspell, beginning a collaboration which would continue until the present day. Owen went on to design a number of shows in a freelance capacity, before joining London's Orbital Sound as a full-time sound designer. In late 2009, Owen left Orbital Sound and formed his own company, Gareth Owen Sound, which he describes as "smoke and mirrors" in the Spotify podcast Conversations with Sound Designers.

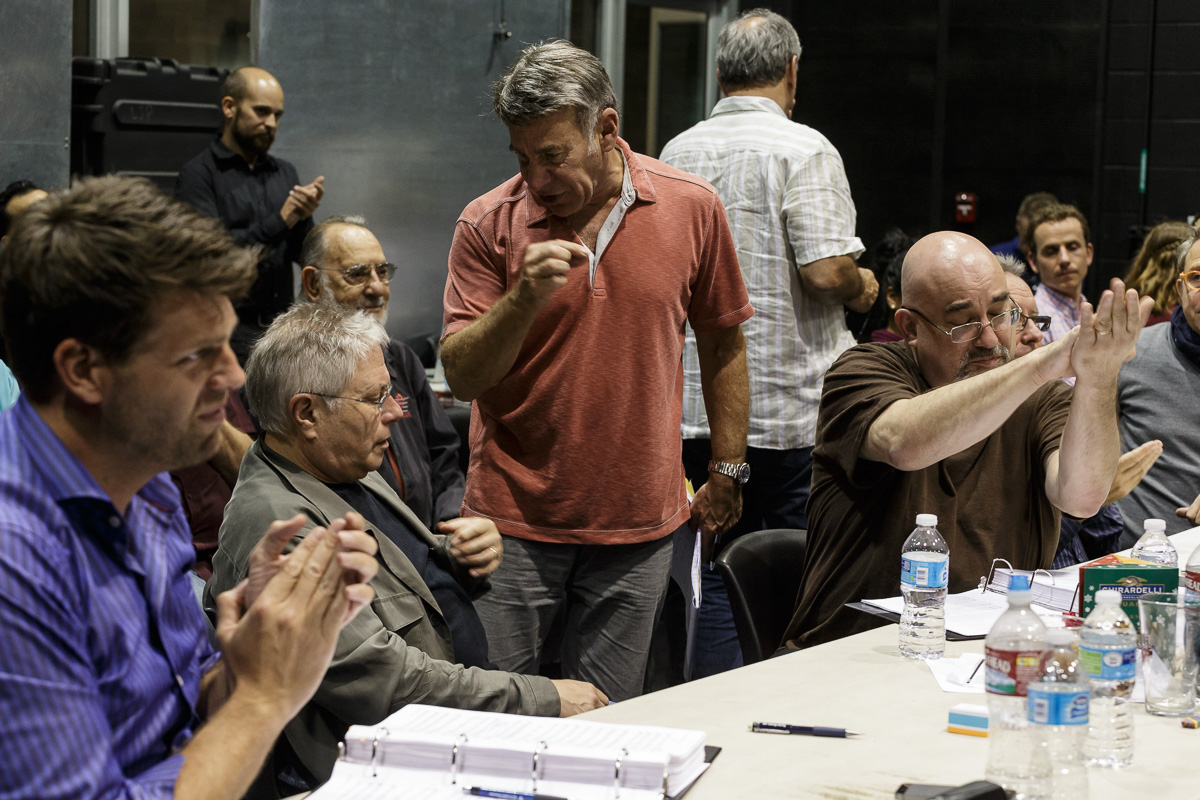
Composer Alan Menken, lyricist Stephen Schwartz, orchestrator Michael Starobin and sound designer Gareth Owen during a developmental rehearsal for Disney's Hunchback of Notre Dame.

Since 2010, Owen has since worked with composers and musicians including Alan Menken, Andrew Lloyd Webber, Stephen Schwartz, Björn Ulvaeus, Glen Ballard, Lin-Manuel Miranda, Max Martin, David Bryan, George Stiles, Cyndi Lauper, Pete Townsend, Alan Silvestri, Alicia Keys, David Foster, SIA, Karey & Wayne Kirkpartick, TLC, Tom Kitt, Stephen Sondheim, Giles Martin, Helen Park, Tom Fletcher, Gary Barlow, Carley Rae-Jepson and Sir Elton John.

Owen has also created musicals based on the music of pop icons such as Michael Jackson, Donna Summer, and The Beatles; and is a collaborator with top directors including Robert De Niro, Christopher Ashley, Jerry Zaks, Des McAnuff, Luke Sheppard, Kwame Kwei-Armah, Jerry Mitchell, Whitney White, Laurence Connor, Christopher Wheeldon, Terry Johnson, Michael Grief, Emerald Fennell, Scott Schwartz, Michael Arden Jon Chu and Sir Trevor Nunn.

Discussing collaboration in musical theatre, Owen is quoted as saying, "I find that the key to making shows sound good is to collaborate with the people who know best what [the sound] is supposed to be. It would be not just arrogant, but shortsighted and stupid of me to not become best friends with Alicia Keys and Adam Blackstone because let's think: who knows what Alicia Keys music is supposed to sound like...? Alicia Keys."

Interviewed regarding stage foldback, Owen says "I'm a great believer that if the musicians, and cast for that matter, hear what they need to hear, they will perform better. And [sic] if they perform better, they will sound better... and then everyone will be like, 'Hey, the sound design is really good...'

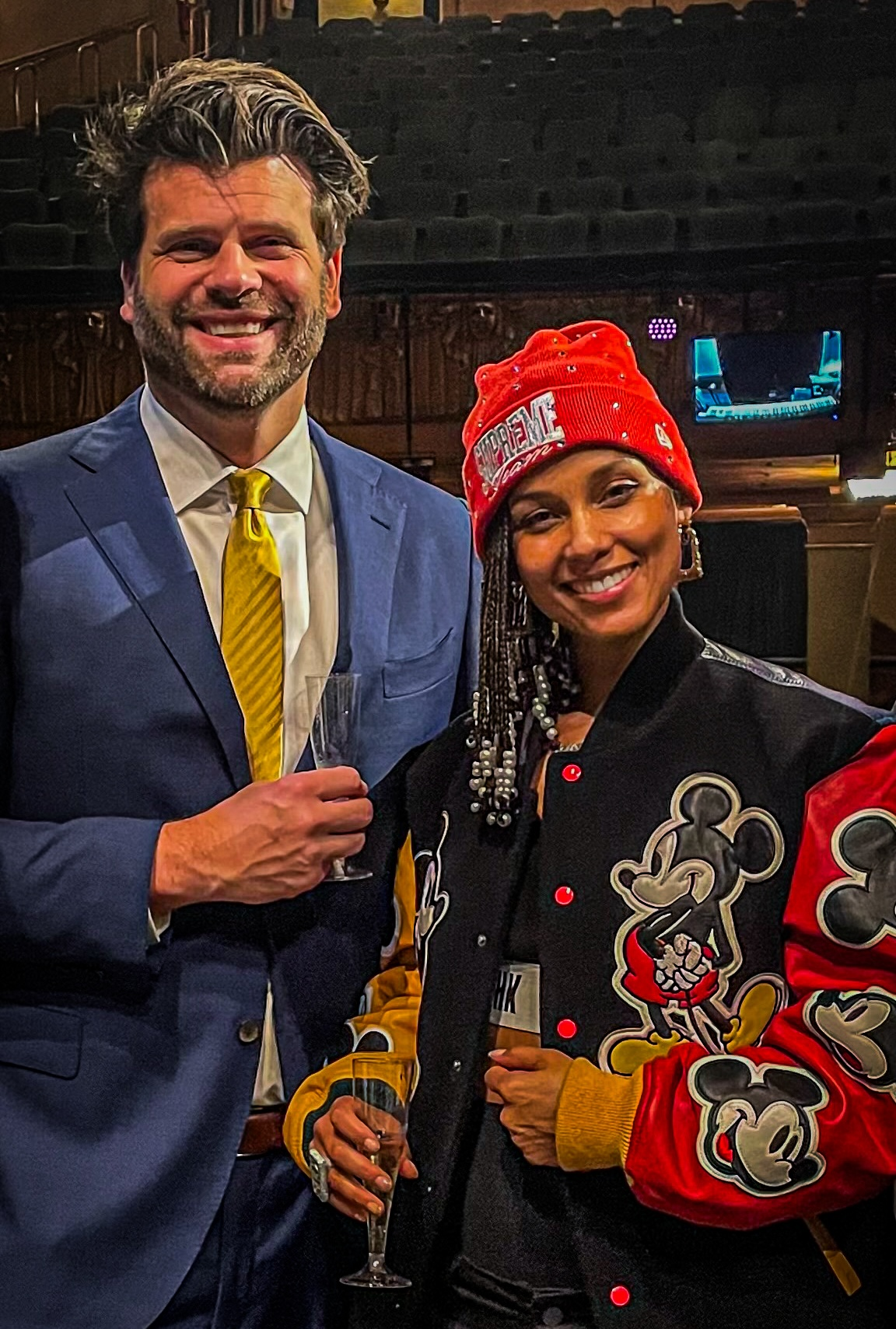
Sixteen-time Grammy winning artiste Alicia Keys with Broadway sound designer Gareth Owen at the first preview of Key's Hell's Kitchen on Broadway.

Discussing acoustic volume of shows in a 2024 LSI Magazine interview, entitled "Making Broadway Rock", Owen, captioned as "Broadway's King of Pop" says "[in the theatre], when people say they want things loud, they don't mean Bon Jovi in Wembley Stadium loud." He follows up on this in another article in FOH Magazine saying "In my experience when people talk about things being loud, they don’t necessarily mean it’s too loud. They mean that certain frequencies are aggressive and painful. In my experience, you can actually make things quite loud if you keep control of the sound, if it rises in volume in a relatively uniform, relatively linear manner. If all the frequencies rise together, it doesn’t become screechy or aggressive or punchy.”

Owen's creative ethos has been discussed at length in multiple interviews, however the most succinct summation of his design philosophy reads “The traditional music theatre sound for a long time was about pretending that sound didn’t exist. It was all about microphones hidden in the hair, the sound of the orchestra coming out of the orchestra pit and voices coming from the people onstage. A ‘good’ sound design was considered to be one you wouldn’t know was there. Today, people go to the movies, hear an orchestra swell around them and they feel it. They put in their AirPods and hear amazing sound, get in their car and hear 29 speakers, or spend $600 at Target on an amazing surround system for their front room—and yet we still go to a theatre and pretend like sound doesn’t exist! I realised, ‘No, the world’s moved on. I’m going to stop apologising for sound.’ I made a conscious decision to take it in a completely different direction, which is a cinematic sound design - so I don’t really do shows that sound like traditional Broadway shows; that’s not really my thing.” "My job is to reproduce the performance as accurately as possible across the entire audience,” says Owen. “I cannot imagine anything more frustrating as a musician, or singer, composer, lyricist, or orchestrator, than to not feel like your work is being delivered to its maximum potential.”

With regard to immersive audio, Owen says, "It’s not a new concept, but it is a new buzzword. We are theatre people, and we’ve been doing what I call immersive audio for decades: putting people in the middle of the sound; and finding ways of localising sound sources from the audience’s perspective. That is theatre sound design..."

== Broadway musical theatre ==
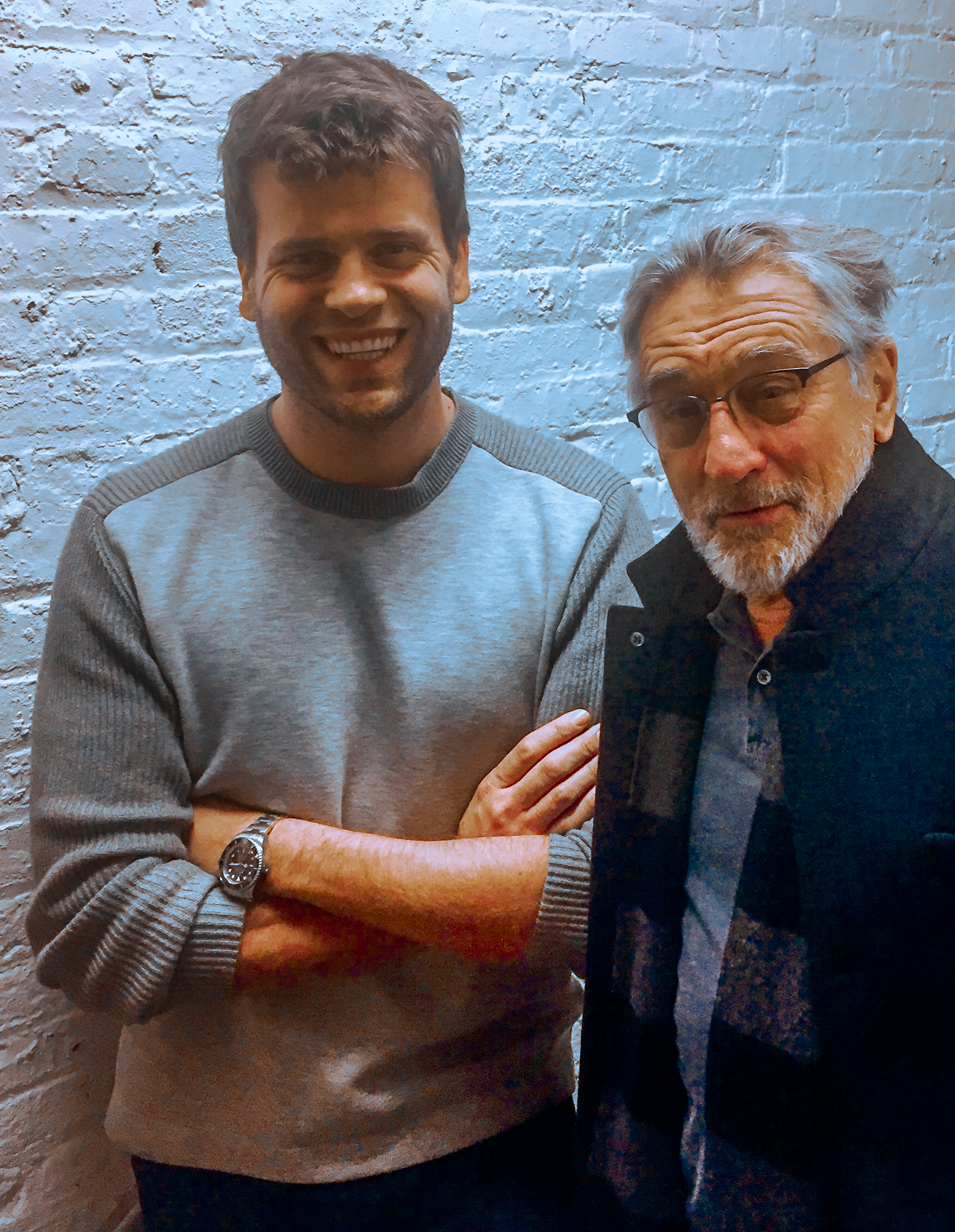
Sound designer Gareth Owen and director Robert De Niro backstage at Bronx Tale on Broadway.

Owen has worked as sound designer on the following Broadway productions in New York City:

- Paddington (original creative), Hirschfeld Theater (2027)
- Purple Rain (original creative), Majestic Theater (2027)
- Wanted (original creative), James Earl Jones Theater (2026)
- Boop! (original creative), Broadhurst Theater (2025)
- Elf, Marquis Theater (2024)
- Hell's Kitchen (original creative), Shubert Theater (2024)
- The Who's Tommy, Nederlander Theater (2024)
- Back to the Future, (original creative), Winter Garden Theater (2023)
- Bad Cinderella, (original creative), Imperial Theater (2023)
- & Juliet, (original creative), The Stephen Sondheim Theatre (2022)
- MJ the Musical, (original creative), Neil Simon Theater (2022)
- Diana, (original creative), Longacre Theater (2020)
- Summer (original creative), Lunt Fontaine Theater (2018)
- Come From Away (original creative), Schoenfeld Theater (2017)
- A Bronx Tale (original creative), Longacre Theater (2016)
- Spring Awakening, Brooks Atkinson Theater (2015)
- Let it Be (original creative), St. James Theater (2013)
- End of the Rainbow (original creative), Belasco Theater (2012)
- A Little Night Music, Walter Kerr Theater (2009)

== West End musical theatre ==
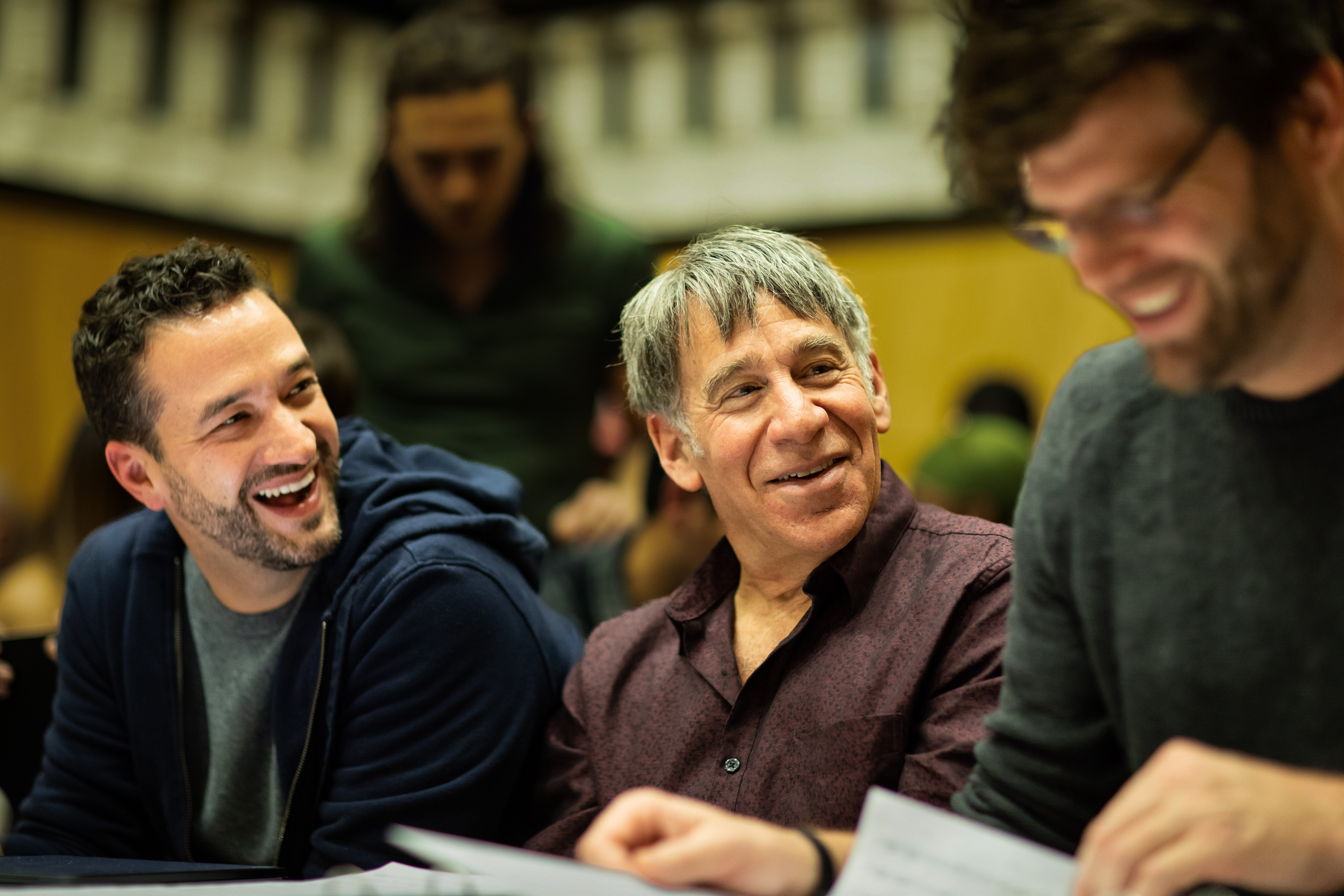
Musical supervisor Dominick Amendum, Wicked composer Stephen Schwartz and sound designer Gareth Owen at the orchestra rehearsal of DreamWorks Prince of Egypt in 2021.

Owen has worked as sound designer on the following West End musical productions in London:

- Paddington (original creative), Savoy Theatre (2025)
- Diamonds & Dust (original creative), Emerald Theatre (2025)
- Just for One Day (original creative), Shaftesbury Theatre (2025)
- The Devil Wears Prada, Dominion Theatre (2024)
- Starlight Express, Troubadour Wembley Park (2024)
- MJ the Musical (original creative), Prince Edward (2024)
- Elf, Dominion Theatre (2022 & 2023 & 2025)
- Back to the Future, (original creative), Adelphi Theatre (2021)
- Cinderella, (original creative), Gillian Lynne Theatre (2021)
- Prince of Egypt, (original creative), Dominion Theatre (2020)
- & Juliet, (original creative), Shaftesbury Theatre (2019)
- Mamma Mia! the Party, (original creative), O2 Arena (2019)
- Joseph and the Amazing Technicolor Dreamcoat, Palladium (2019 & 2021)
- Strictly Ballroom, (original creative), Piccadilly Theatre (2017)
- Bat Out of Hell, (original creative), Coliseum Theatre (2017)
- Young Frankenstein, Garrick Theatre (2017)
- 42nd Street, Drury Lane Theatre (2017)
- Wind in the Willows, (original creative), Palladium Theatre (2016)
- Mrs Henderson Presents, (original creative), Noël Coward Theatre (2015)
- In the Heights, Kings Cross Theatre (2015)
- Memphis, Shaftesbury Theatre (2014)
- Forbidden Broadway, Vaudeville Theatre (2014)
- Hey, Old Friends, Drury Lane Theatre (2014)
- I Can't Sing, (original creative), Palladium Theatre (2014)
- Merrily We Roll Along, Comedy Theatre (2013)
- Midnight Tango, Phoenix Theatre (2013)
- Let it Be, (original creative), Prince of Wales Theatre (2012)
- Top Hat, (original creative), Aldwych Theatre (2011)
- Fame, Shaftesbury Theatre (2010)
- Sweet Charity, Haymarket Theatre (2009)
- Shout!, Arts Theatre (2009)
- A Little Night Music, Garrick Theatre (2008)
- La Cage Aux Follies, Playhouse Theatre (2008)
- Maria Friedman Re-Arranged (original creative), Trafalgar Studios (2008)
- Carousel, Savoy Theatre (2008)
- Fiddler on the Roof, Savoy Theatre (2007)
- Little Shop of Horrors, Duke of Yorks Theatre (2007)
- Footloose, Novello Theatre (2006)
- High Society, Shaftesbury Theatre (2005)
- The Big Life, (original creative), Apollo Theatre (2005)
- Snow White & The Seven Dwarfs, (original creative), Victoria Palace (2004)

Owen is also listed as the sound designer and original creative for the London Palladium Christmas Pantomime from its inception in 2016 through until 2021. His company, Gareth Owen Sound, remains credited as sound designer until 2024.

== International and regional musical theatre ==
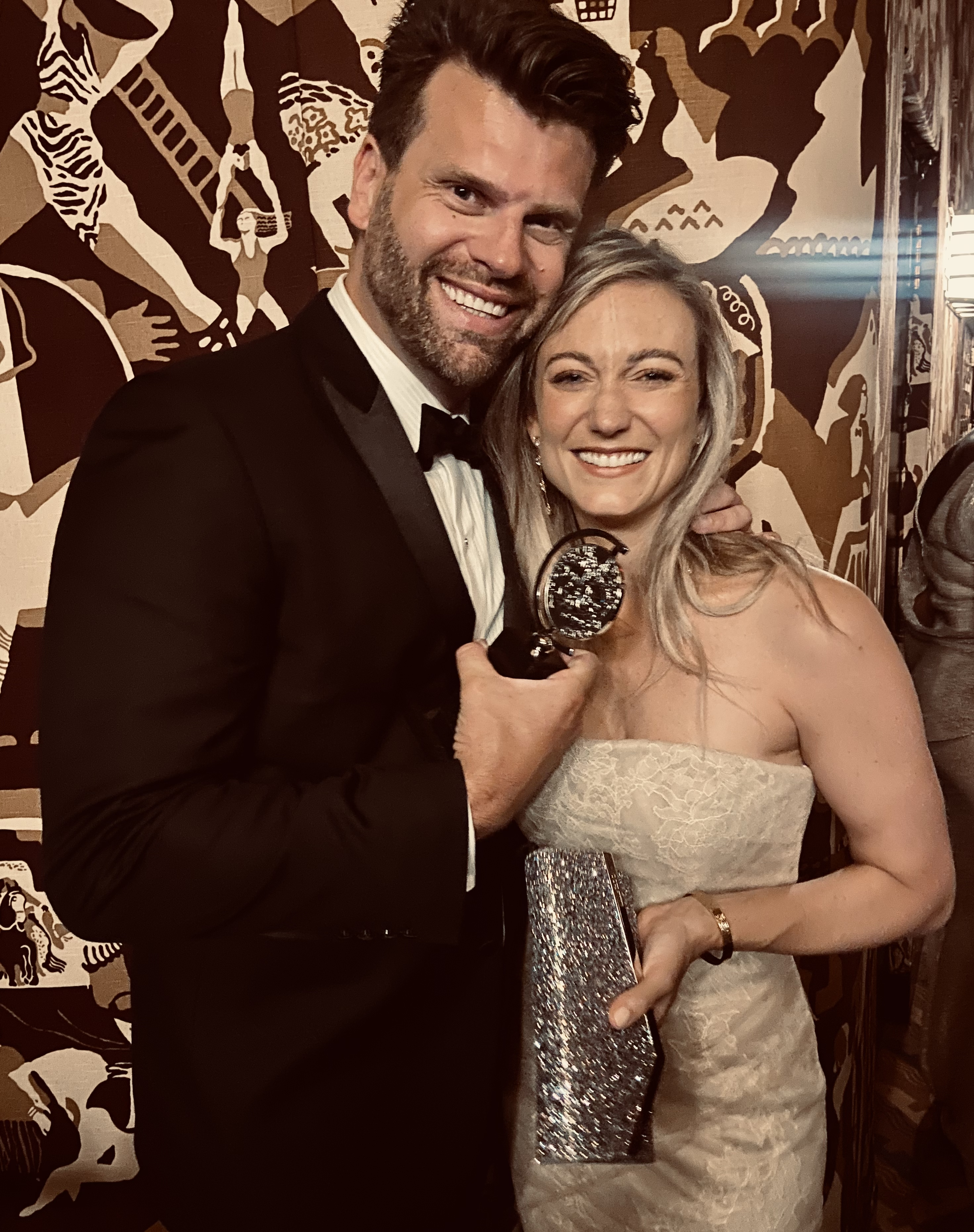
Gareth Owen and wife Carmen Bierens at the 2022 Tony Awards in New York.

Owen has worked as sound designer on the following productions around the world:

- Thelma & Louise (original creative), The Young Vic, London (2026)
- Crazy Sexy Cool (original creative), Arena Stage (2026)
- Working Girl (original creative), La Jolla Playhouse (2025)
- Mrs Doubtfire, Germany, UK Tour & Australia (2025 & 2026)
- Saturday Church (original creative), New York Theatre Workshop (2025)
- The Heart (original creative), La Jolla Playhouse, Laura Pels Theatre (2025 & 2026)
- Sing Street, Lyric Hammersmith (2025)
- Cirque du Soleil: Songblazers (original creative), US Tour (2024)
- Pretty Woman, Netherlands & Germany (2023 & 2025)
- Civilisation to Nation (original creative), Mumbai (2024)
- Bat Out of Hell (original creative), The Paris Theatre, Las Vegas (2022)
- Kinky Boots, Stage 42, New York (2022)
- What's New Pussycat? (original creative), Birmingham Rep Theatre, Birmingham (2021)
- Hello Dolly!, Netherlands (2020)
- Starlight Express Bochum, Germany (2018)
- Carmen La Cubana (original creative), Madrid (2018)
- Eugenius! (original creative), The Other Palace, London (2018)
- Jersey Boys, International Tour (2017)
- Clueless (original creative), Signature Theater, Off-Broadway (2018)
- Christmasaurus, Hammersmith Apollo, London (2017)
- The Secret Garden, The Lincoln Center, New York (2017)
- Miss Atomic Bomb (original creative), The Other Palace, London (2016)
- Schikaneder (original creative), Vienna (2016)
- The Little Prince (original creative), Abu Dhabi (2016)
- Bodyguard, Netherlands (2015)
- Beauty & The Beast, Netherlands (2015)
- Titanic, Toronto (2015)
- The Producers, UK Tour (2015)
- Dan & Phil - The Amazing Tour is not on Fire (original creative), US Tour
- Secret Cinema - The Empire Strikes Back, London (2015)
- Disney's Hunchback of Notre Dame, (original creative), worldwide (2014)
- Moeder ik wil bij de revue (original creative), Netherlands (2014)
- Fings Ain't Wot They Used T'Be, Theatre Royal Stratford East, London (2014)
- Disney's Beauty & The Beast, worldwide (2014)
- Evita, Slovenia (2014)
- Ice! (original creative), UK Tour (2014)
- The Hutchhiker's Guide to the Galaxy, UK Tour (2012)
- Jesus Christ SuperStar, Slovenia, (2012)
- Nine to Five, UK Tour (2012)
- Disney's The Little Mermaid, worldwide (2012)
- Sister Act, worldwide (2011)
- The Sound of Music, Kuala Lumpur (2011)
- Tell Me On A Sunday, UK Tour (2011)
- Corrie, UK Tour (2011)
- Hairspray, worldwide (2010)
- Guess How Much I Love You? (original creative), UK Tour (2010)
- High School Musical Two, UK Tour, (original creative) (2009)
- Flashdance, (original creative), UK Tour (2009)
- Can't Smile Without You (original creative), UK Tour (2008)
- Saturday Night Fever, South East Asian Tour (2007)
- Shout! (original creative), UK Tour (2007)
- Fame, UK Tour (2007)
- The Wedding Singer (original creative), UK Tour (2006)
- Footloose, UK Tour (2006)
- Annie Get Your Gun, UK Tour (2005)
- The Next Big Thing (original creative), Charing Cross Theatre, London (2005)
- Bashment (original creative), Theatre Royal Stratford East, London (2005)
- The Battle of Green Lanes (original creative), Theatre Royal Stratford East, London (2004)
- GodSpell, UK Tour (2002)
- Snow White & The Seven Dwarfs, Plymouth Theatre Royal, Plymouth (2001)
- Thelma & Louise, Young Vic.

== West End straight plays ==
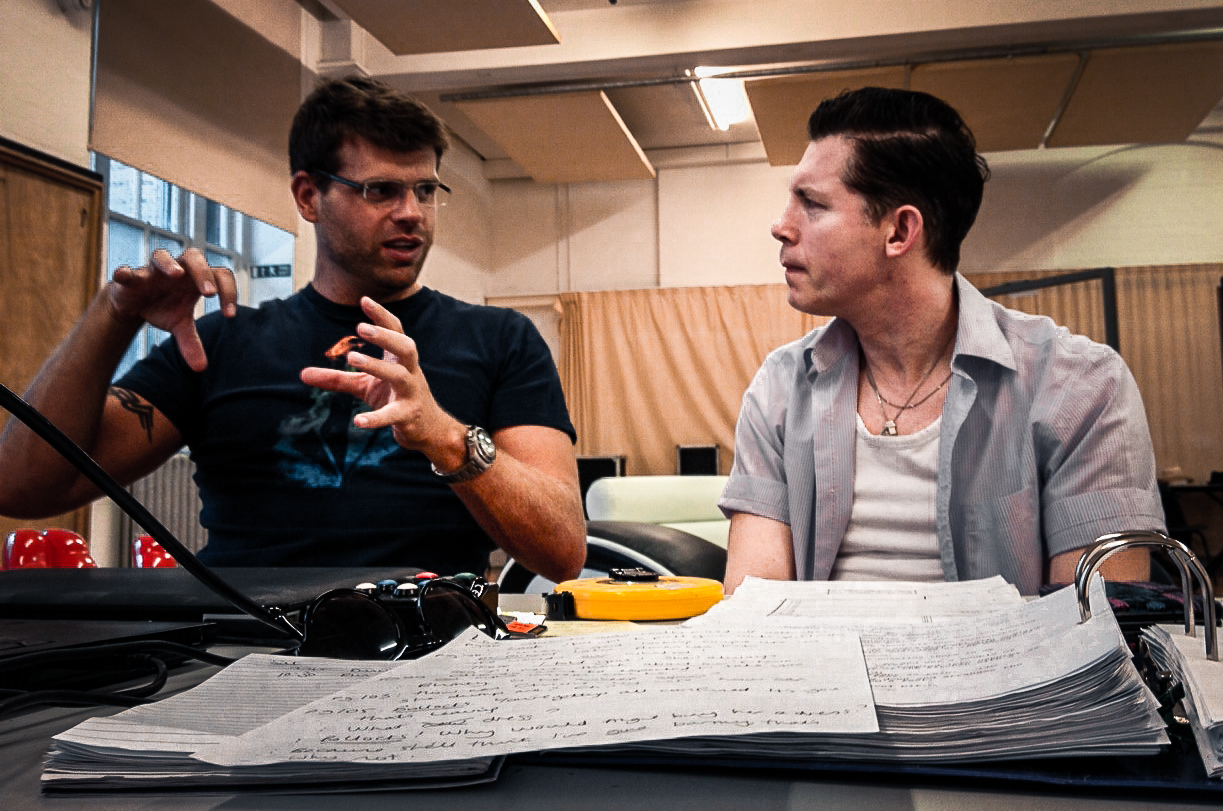
Sound designer Gareth Owen and comedian Lee Evans during Barking in Essex rehearsals in London in 2013.

Owen has worked as sound designer on the following West End straight plays in London, although the timeline suggests he is no longer active in this particular discipline:

- The Importance of Being Ernest, Vaudeville Theatre (2015)
- Barking in Essex (original creative), Wyndhams Theatre (2013)
- Uncle Vanya, Vaudeville Theatre (2012)
- Long Days Journey in to Night, Apollo Theatre (2012)
- Sign of the Times, (original creative), Duchess Theatre (2011)
- Ruby Wax: Losing It (original creative), Duchess Theatre (2011)
- End of the Rainbow (original creative), Trafalgar Theatre (2010)
- Woman in Black, Fortune Theatre (2010)
- An Ideal Husband, Vaudeville Theatre (2010)
- Prick Up Your Ears (original creative), Comedy Theatre (2009)
- Dealers Choice, Trafalgar Theatre (2007)
- Jeffery Bernard is Unwell, Garrick Theatre (2006)
- Dickens Unplugged!, Comedy Theatre (2008)
- Epitaph for George Dillon, Comedy Theatre (2005)

== The Menier Chocolate Factory ==
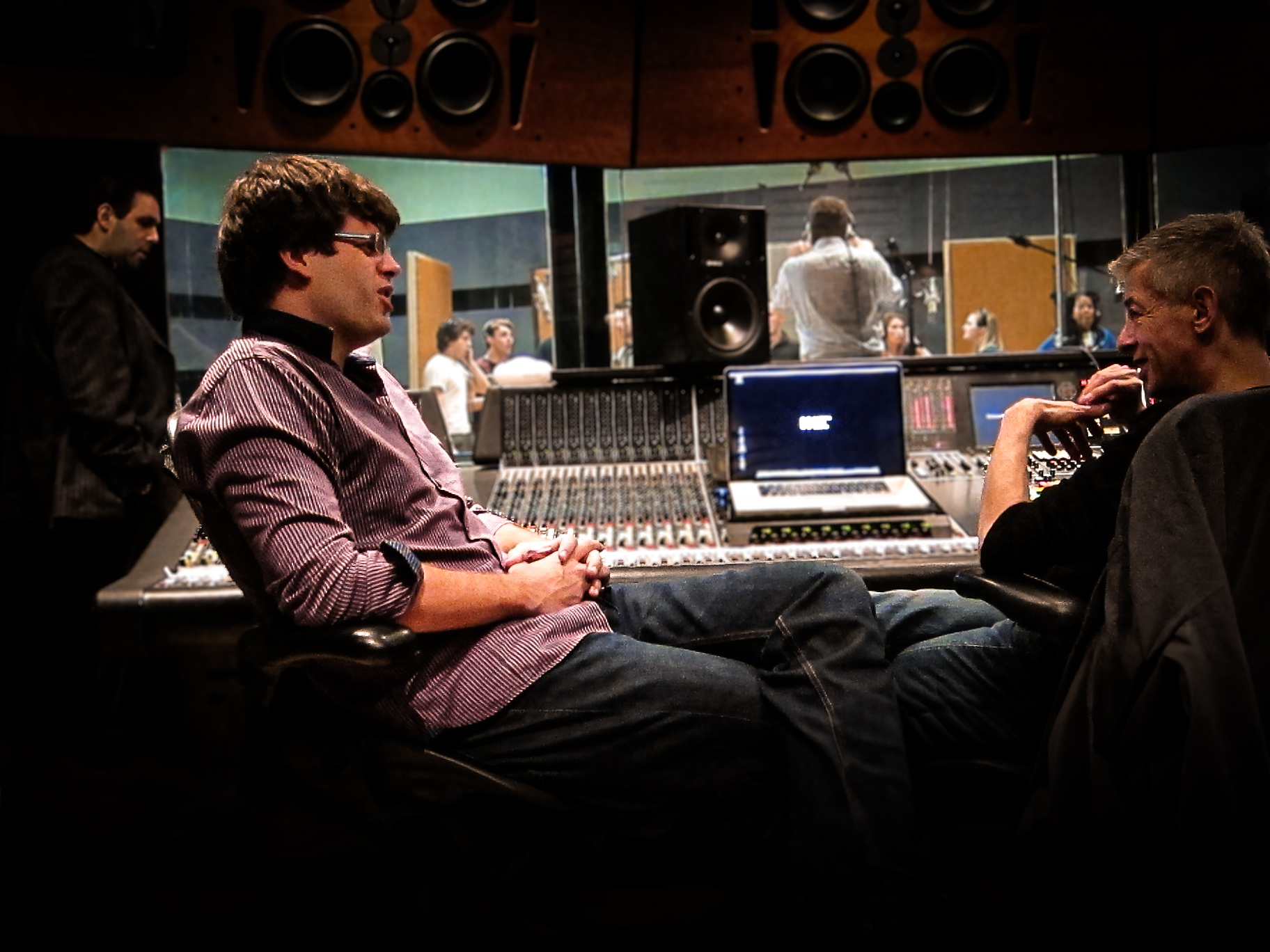
Sound Designer Gareth Owen with Musical Supervisor Simon Lee and producer David Babani during the album recording of Pippin at the Menier Chocolate Factory.

Over the course approximately a decade, Owen designed most of the musicals and plays at Off-West End theatre, The Menier Chocolate Factory in London.

- Candide, Menier Chocolate Factory (2014)
- Merrily We Roll Along, Menier Chocolate Factory (2013)
- Without You (original creative), Menier Chocolate Factory (2012)
- Torch Song Trilogy, Menier Chocolate Factory (2012)
- Pippin, Menier Chocolate Factory (2012)
- Road Show, Menier Chocolate Factory (2011)
- Smash! (original creative), Menier Chocolate Factory (2011)
- Ruby Wax: Losing It (original creative), Menier Chocolate Factory (2011)
- The Invisible Man, Menier Chocolate Factory (2011)
- Aspects of Love, Menier Chocolate Factory (2010)
- Paradise Found, Menier Chocolate Factory (2010)
- Hannah Waddingham Live (original creative), Menier Chocolate Factory (2010)
- Sweet Charity, Menier Chocolate Factory (2010)
- Forbidden Broadway, Menier Chocolate Factory (2009)
- A Little Night Music, Menier Chocolate Factory (2009)
- They're Playing Our Song, Menier Chocolate Factory (2008)
- Maria Friedman Re-Arranged (original creative), Menier Chocolate Factory (2008)
- Dealer's Choice (original creative), Menier Chocolate Factory (2007)
- Little Shop of Horrors, Menier Chocolate Factory (2006)
- The Last Five Years, Menier Chocolate Factory (2006)
- Breakfast With Jonny Wilkinson (original creative), Menier Chocolate Factory (2006)
- Tick Tick...BOOM!, Menier Chocolate Factory (2005)
- Murderer, Menier Chocolate Factory (2004)

Owen is also listed as the sound designer for the 2006 Menier production of Sunday in the Park with George but he does not include this production on any listed resume or biography.

== Technical achievements ==
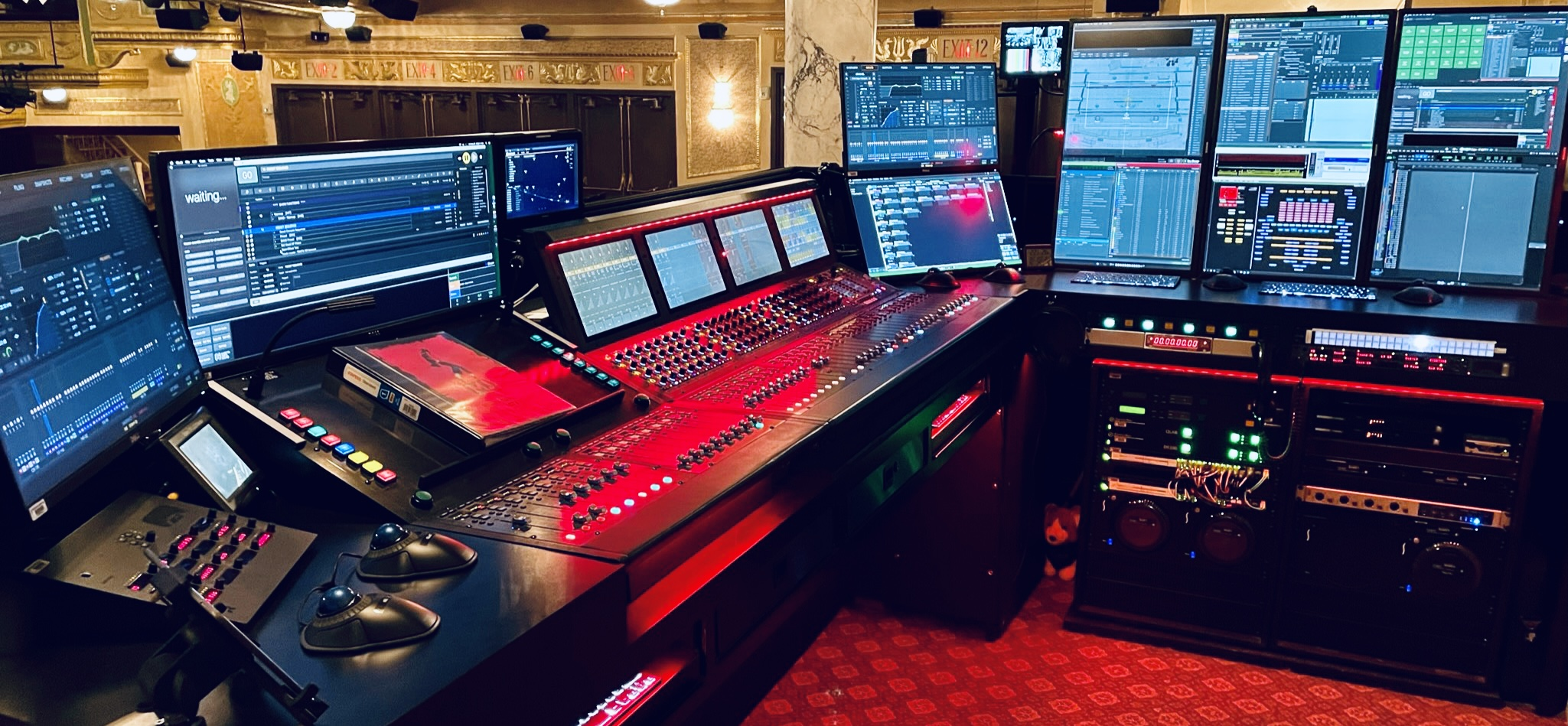
MJ: The Musical mixing console at the Neil Simon Theater on Broadway.

Owen is credited with a long list of technical achievements and industry firsts.

Despite being quoted as saying that immersive audio "is not a new concept, but it is a new buzzword", Owen is considered to be a pioneer in the field of immersive theatre sound. Owen was the first person to use the object based wave field synthesis immersive audio in both Londons West End and on New Yorks Broadway, for the musicals Come from Away and Diana, respectively. He created the world's first sound design to incorporate object based mixing in to a rotating auditorium for Andrew Lloyd Webbers Cinderella musical at the Gillian Lynne Theatre in London; and what was, at the time, the largest SoundScape installation in the world for arena musical Starlight Express. Owen is also credited as the first person to integrate wireless tracking of performers in to an object based sound system on Broadway, this time for MJ the Musical. Indeed, he and his team are credited with creating one of the industry standard control applications for live immersive audio, d&b's EnSnap, used on multiple shows and productions around the world.

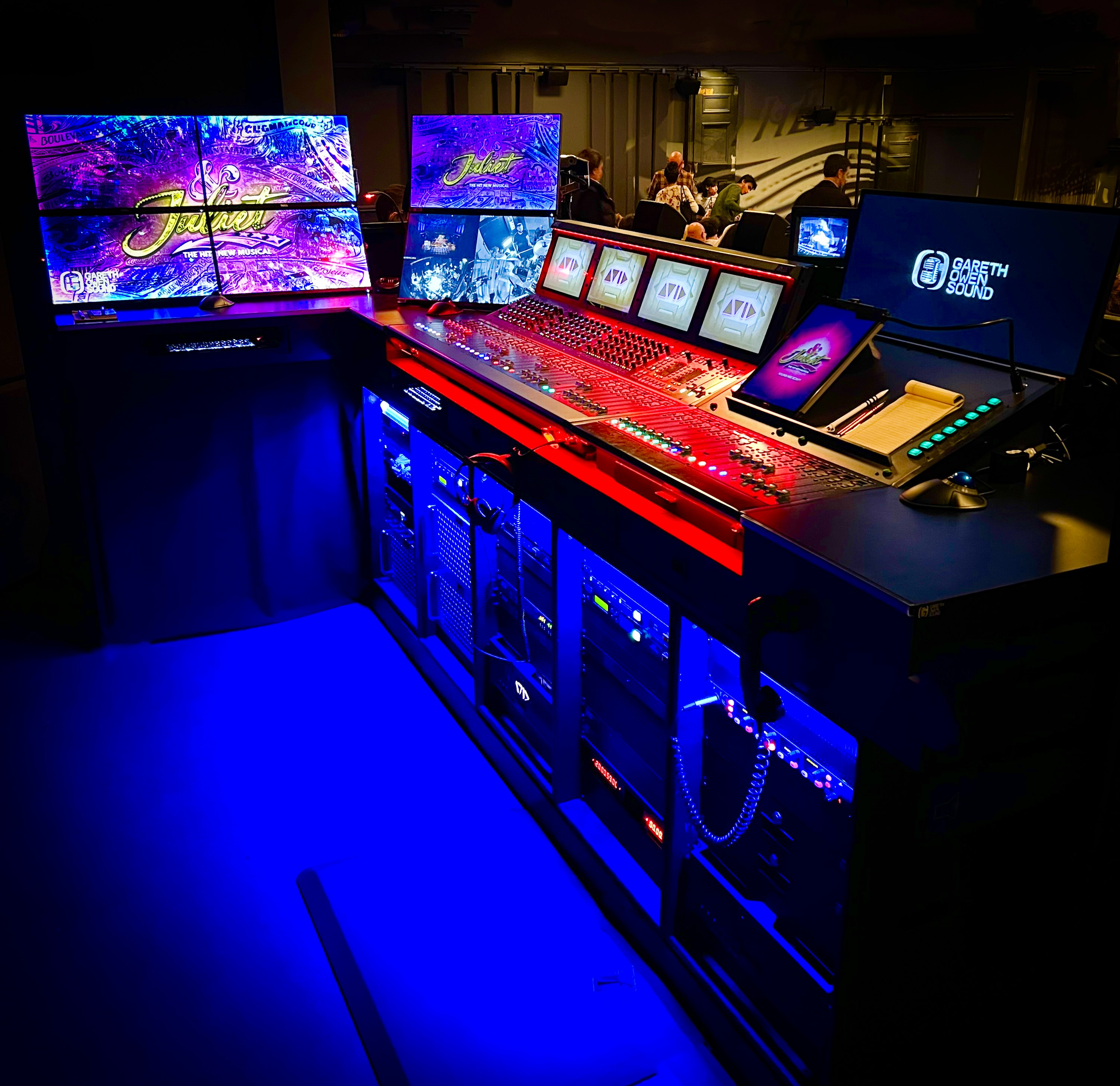
& Juliet mixing console at the Stephen Sondheim Theater on Broadway.

Owen's use and development of cutting-edge technologies is not limited to immersive audio. He is believed to have designed the show with the largest number of radio mics ever used on a west end musical, 42nd Street at Londons Drury Lane.

Owen tends to the bleeding edge of technology, often the first to use new speaker models in theatre. Examples include : First use of the d&b KSL line array system on both Broadway and the west end, in both cases for Back to the Future the musical. First use of the d&b XSL line array system on Broadway, this time for & Juliet at the Sondheim theater. First use of d&b's CCL system in a theatre, initially for Diamonds & Dust at the Emerald theatre and then as a SoundScape system for Paddington: the musical at the Savoy Theatre in London,f or which The Stage commented, "The technical wizardry required to make the adorable ursine hero of this blockbuster show talk and sing is pretty jaw-dropping - all the more so because Owen makes it look so effortless."

Owen was the first person to use a DiGiCo mixing console in theatre, the now defunct D5, for the UK Tour of the Cliff Richard musical Summer Holiday. He is credited as being the first to use both the Avid Venue mixing console and the Avid S6L mixing console in theatre, for the shows Annie Get Your Gun and Broadways Come From Away respectively. He is credited for designing much of the snapshot and automation systems in the Avid live mixing consoles. Owen was one of the early adopters of computer game audio engines to create dynamic sound effects in theatre, notably on Broadway's Back to the Future musical and London's Paddington: the musical.

== Business ventures ==
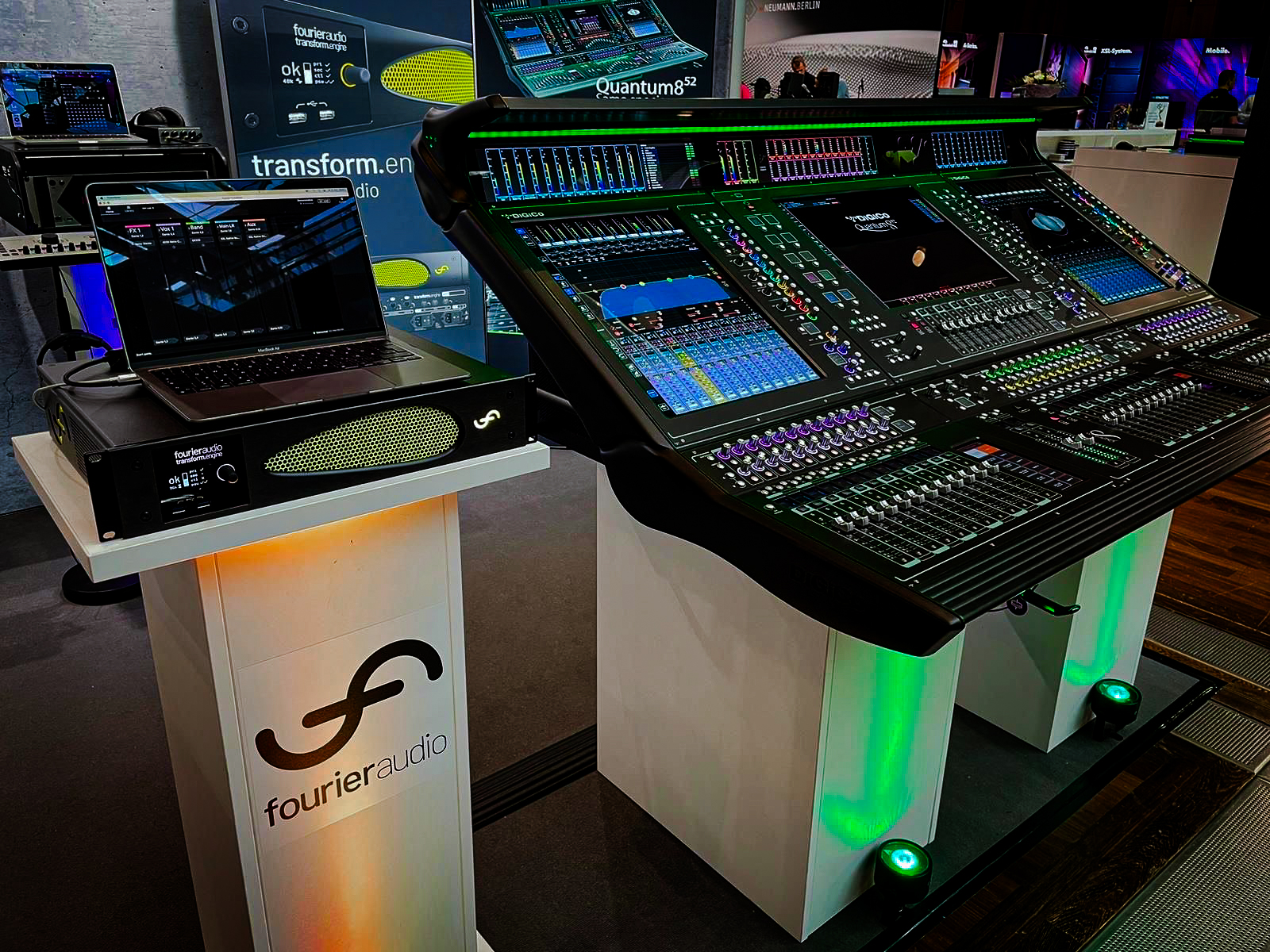
The Fourier Audio transform.engine at the NAMM trade show in Los Angeles.

Owen is co-founder and CCO of audio hardware manufacturer Fourier Audio, where he is "working to redefine the future of pro audio". In 2023, he and his co-founders Henry Harrod and Peter Bridgman sold Fourier Audio to live mixing desk manufacturer DiGiCo for an undisclosed multi-million pound sum. From this springboard they went on to release the transform.engine, a revolutionary VST plugin host, designed exclusively for the live environment, which won the PLASA Innovation Award.

Owen is also a co-founder of the software house Show Control Ltd, a company specialising in the coding and development of dedicated theatrical show control systems. There is little information available regarding this endeavour beyond a list of the developed software on Owen's website.

== Other endeavours ==
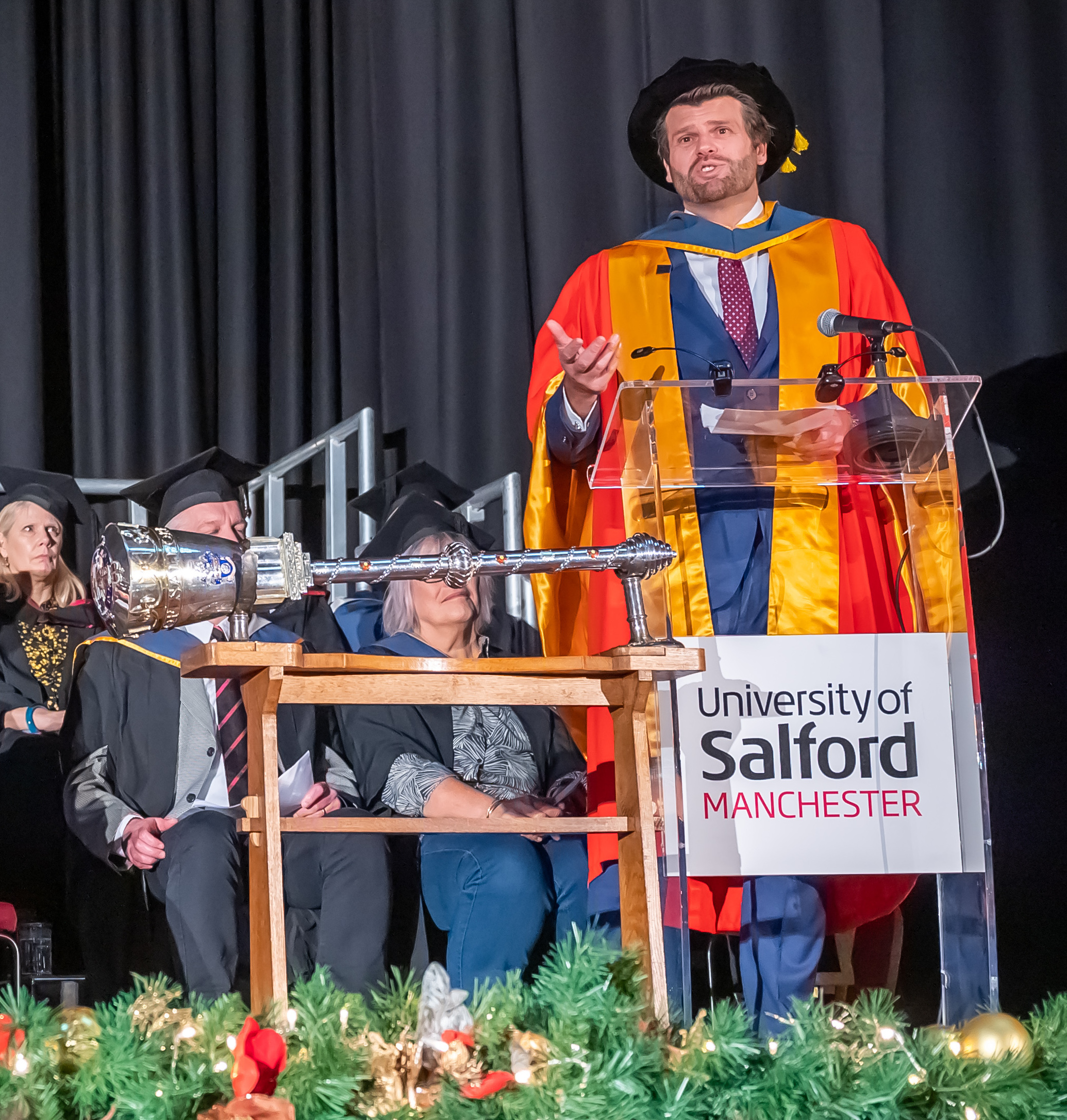
Honorary Doctorate at Salford University

In 2009, Owen joined a steering committee that eventually formed the Association of Sound Designers where he served as a committee member for the maximum term of five years, from 2012 to 2018.

In 2022, Owen was presented with an Honorary Doctorate from the University of Salford, for pushing the boundaries of modern sound design techniques, particularly in the field of spatial audio and musical theatre sound design.

2024 saw Owen collaborate with "pioneer of modern sound design" Martin Levan to present a series of lectures on sound design at London's PLASA show.

== Selected awards ==
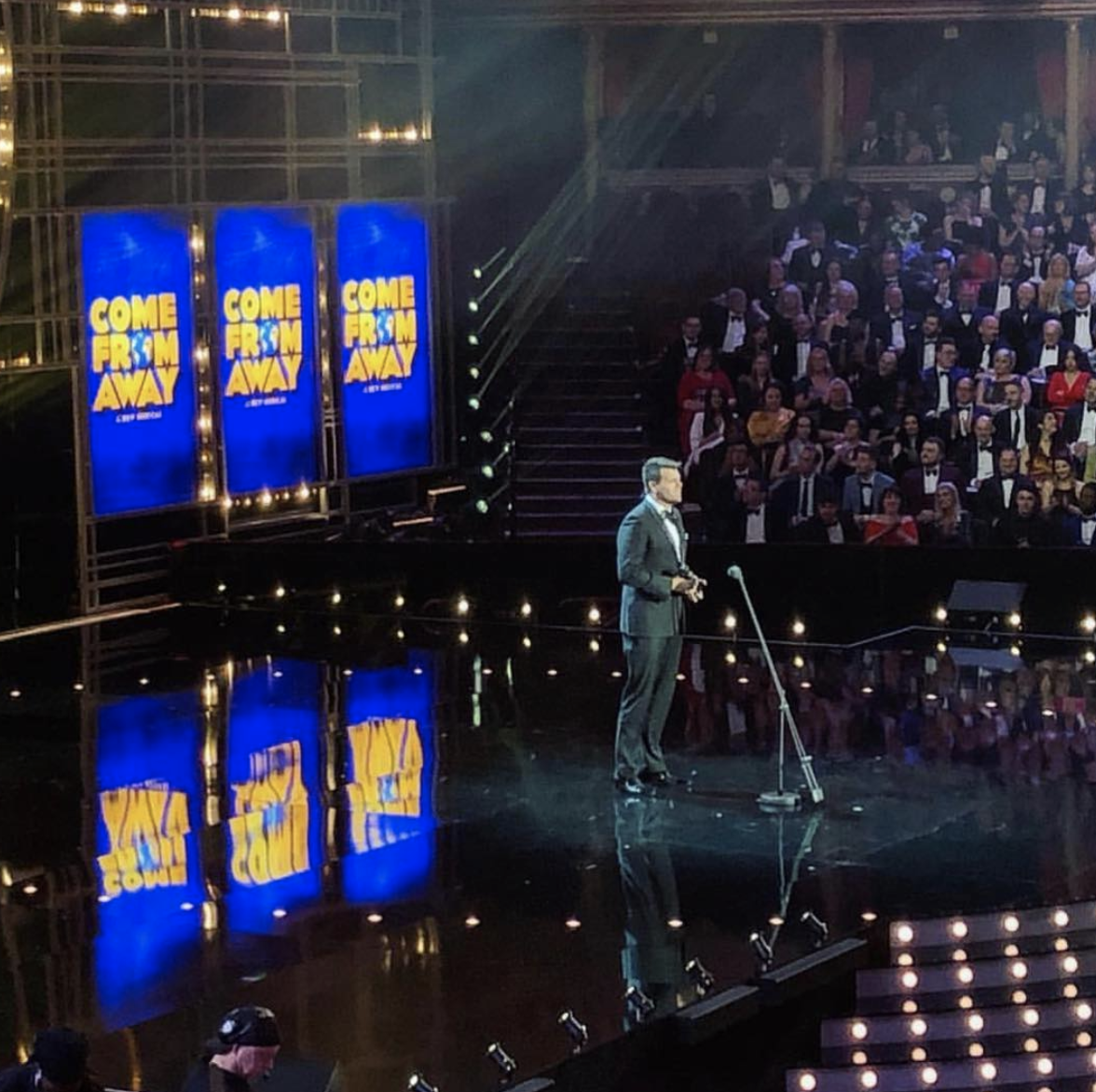
Owen collects the Olivier Award for Best Sound Design at the 2019 Olivier Awards

Year	Nominated work	Category	Result	Notes
2026	Paddington: The Musical	Olivier Award for Best Sound Design	Nominated	
2026	Paddington: The Musical	WhatsOnStage Award for Best Sound Design	Won	
2026	The Heart	Craig Noel Award for Best Sound Design	Won	
2024	Starlight Express	WhatsOnStage Award for Best Sound Design	Nominated	
2024	Hell's Kitchen	Tony Award for Best Sound Design of a Musical	Nominated	
2024	Fourier transform.engine	Parnelli Award	Nominated	
2024	Fourier transform.engine	PLASA Innovation Award	Won	
2024	The Who's Tommy	Outer Critics Circle Award for Best Sound Design	Nominated	
2024	Back to the Future	Outer Critics Circle Award for Best Sound Design	Nominated	
2023	The Who's Tommy	Joseph Jefferson Award for Best Sound Design of a Musical	Won	
2023	& Juliet	Tony Award for Best Sound Design of a Musical	Nominated	
2023	& Juliet	BroadwayWorld Award for Best Sound Design of a Musical	Won	
2022	MJ: The Musical	Tony Award for Best Sound Design of a Musical	Won	
2022	MJ: The Musical	Drama Desk Award for Best Sound Design of a Musical	Won	
2022	Back to the Future: The Musical	Olivier Award for Best Sound Design	Nominated	
2022	Back to the Future: The Musical	WhatsOnStage Award for Best Sound Design	Won	
2020	Come From Away	BroadwayWorld Award for Best Sound Design of the Decade	Nominated	
2020	Come From Away	Green Room Award for Best Sound Design	Won	
2020	Come From Away	WhatsOnStage Award for Best Sound Design	Won	
2020	& Juliet	WhatsOnStage Award for Best Sound Design	Nominated	
2019	Come From Away	Olivier Award for Best Sound Design	Won	
2019	Palladium Pantomime	The Pantomime Awards for Best Sound Design	Won	
2019	The Donna Summer Musical	NAACP Theatre Award for Best Sound Larger Theatre	Nominated	
2018	Starlight Express (Bochum)	Pro Sound Award for Best Immersive Design	Won	
2018	Carmen La Cubana	BroadwayWorld Germany Award for Best Sound Design	Won	
2018	Bat Out of Hell The Musical	AV Technology Award for Best Use of Audio Solutions	Won	
2018	Bat Out of Hell The Musical	Olivier Award for Best Sound Design	Nominated	
2018	Come From Away	BroadwayWorld Toronto Award for Best Original Sound Design	Won	
2018	Come From Away	BroadwayWorld Award for Best Sound Design	Won	
2018	Summer	Craig Noel Award for Best Sound Design	Nominated	
2017	Bat Out of Hell The Musical	AV Technology Award for Best Sound Design	Won	
2017	Bat Out of Hell The Musical	BroadwayWorld Award for Best Sound Design	Won	
2017	Come From Away	Outer Critics Circle Award for Best Sound Design	Won	
2017	Come From Away	Dora Award for Best Sound Design	Won	
2017	Come From Away	Helen Hayes Award for Best Sound Design	Won	
2017	Individual Recognition	Pro Sound Award for Sound Engineer of the Year	Won	
2016	A Bronx Tale	BroadwayWorld Award for Best Sound Design	Won	
2015	Memphis	Olivier Award for Best Sound Design	Won	
2015	Memphis	Pro Sound Award for Best Theatre Sound	Won	
2015	Hunchback of Notre Dame	BroadwayWorld Award for Best Sound Design	Nominated	
2014	Merrily We Roll Along	Olivier Award for Best Sound Design	Won	
2014	I Can't Sing!	Pro Sound Award for Best Theatre Sound	Won	
2013	Top Hat	Olivier Award for Best Sound Design	Nominated	
2012	End of the Rainbow	Tony Award for Best Sound Design of a Musical	Nominated	
2011	End of the Rainbow	Olivier Award for Best Sound Design	Nominated	
2010	A Little Night Music	Tony Award for Best Sound Design of a Musical	Nominated	
