= MIDI Show Control =

Technical specification extending MIDI

MIDI Show Control (MSC), is a real-time System Exclusive extension of the Musical Instrument Digital Interface (MIDI) standard. MSC enables all types of entertainment equipment to communicate with each other through the process of show control.

The MIDI Show Control protocol is a technical standard ratified by the MIDI Manufacturers Association in 1991, which allows entertainment control devices to talk with each other and with computers to perform show control functions in live and prerecorded entertainment applications. Just like musical MIDI, MSC does not transmit the actual show media – it simply transmits real-time digital information about a multimedia performance.

== How MSC works ==
When any cue is called by a user (typically a stage manager) or preprogrammed timeline in a show control software application, the show controller transmits one or more MSC messages from its MIDI out port. A typical MSC message sequence is:

1. the user has just called a cue
2. the cue is for lighting device 3
3. the cue is number 45.8
4. the cue is in cue list 7

Other performance parameters are also transmitted, such as lighting desk submaster settings using MSC SET messages.

MSC messages are serially transmitted in the same way as musical messages and are fully compatible with all conventional MIDI hardware; however, many modern MSC devices now use Ethernet communications for higher bandwidth and the flexibility afforded by networks.

All cues that a media control device is capable of playing are assigned MSC messages within the show controller's cue list and they are transmitted from its MIDI out port at the appropriate show time, depending on the actions of the user and the show controller's internally timed sequences.

All MSC-compatible instruments follow the MSC specification and thus transmit identical MSC messages for identical MSC events, such as the playing of a certain cue on the media controller. Since they follow a published standard, all MSC devices can communicate with and understand each other, as well as communicate with computers that have been programmed to understand MSC messages using the MSC command set. All MSC compatible instruments have a built-in MIDI interface and many now follow one of the various MIDI-over-Ethernet protocols.

== History ==
To create the MSC spec, Charlie Richmond headed the USITT MIDI Forum on their Callboard Network in 1990, which included developers and designers from the international theatre sound and lighting industry. This Forum created the MSC standard between January and September 1990. This was ratified by the MIDI Manufacturers Association in January 1991, and the Japan MIDI Standards Committee (JMSC) later that year, becoming a part of the standard MIDI specification in August 1991. The first show to fully use the MSC specification was the Magic Kingdom Parade at Walt Disney World's Magic Kingdom in September 1991.

== MIDI Show Control software ==
Software	Platform	Developer
Martin M-PC	Windows	Martin Professional
SM-Designer	Windows	Richmond Sound Design
Navigator	Windows	Tait Towers
ABEdit	Windows	Richmond Sound Design
ShowMan	Windows	Richmond Sound Design
ABShowMaker	macOS	Richmond Sound Design
IMEASY	Windows, macOS	
Manager	Windows	
SFX	Windows	
V-Control	Windows, macOS, Linux	
showcontrolpro (scp)	Windows, macOS	
SAMSC	macOS	
Pure Data	Windows, macOS, Linux	
MAX/MSP	Windows, macOS, Linux	
TRAX	macOS	
GType	Windows	
ShowFlow	Windows	
QLab	macOS	Figure 53
TJShow	Windows	
CUE Showcontrol	Windows	
PCStage	Windows	
CSC	Windows	
MultiPlay	Windows	
Isadora	Windows, macOS	Troikatronix
Watchout	Windows	
Show Cue Systems	Windows	
Jands Vista	Windows, macOS	
ChamSys MagicQ	Windows, macOS, Linux	
D::Light	Windows, macOS, Linux	Nicolas Bats
Eos	Windows, macOS	ETC
grandMA3 (v2.4.2.2 =<)	Windows, macOS	MA Lighting Technology

== See also ==
- Sound design
- Theatre lighting
