= List of sound designers =

This list of sound designers consists of notable sound designers for film, television, and theatre.

== Sound designers ==
- Ben Burtt
- Suzanne Ciani
- Jack Foley
- Glenn Freemantle
- Theo Green
- Kai Harada
- Neil Hillman
- Prince Anselm
- Richard Hymns
- Ren Klyce
- Anthony Marinelli
- Tony Meola
- Walter Murch
- Cricket S. Myers
- Gareth Owen
- Bob Pomann
- Gary Rydstrom
- Frédéric Sanchez
- Alan Splet
- Randy Thom
- Dan Moses Schreier
- Sophie (musician)
- David Van Tieghem
- Richard Devine
- Squarepusher
- Aphex Twin
- Bogdan Raczynski

== Sound design engineers and inventors ==
- John S. Bowen
- Dan Dugan
- Bruce Jackson
- Pierre Schaeffer
- Wendy Carlos

== See also ==
- Tony Award for Best Sound Design
