= Crash box =

Crash box may refer to:

- Crash box (vehicle collision), an energy absorbing device installed in order to reduce repair costs in low-speed vehicle collisions
- Crash box (stagecraft), a stagecraft device which reproduces a crash or collision sound effect
- Crash gearbox, non-synchromesh automobile transmission
- Crashbox, an American-Canadian educational children's television series
