= Association of Sound Designers =

British theatrical sound engineering charity

The Association for Sound Design and Production (ASDP), formerly known as the Association of Sound Designers (ASD), is a British charity representing a large proportion of the British theatrical sound design and engineering community.

== Formation ==
In December 2009, Gregg Fisher organised a series of meetings with a small group of sound designers to start discussing the formation of an association for sound designers. This group of sound designers formed a steering committee and began discussing what such an organisation should do and how it might exist. The steering committee consisted of: Gareth Fry, Gareth Owen, Paul Arditti, Ian Dickinson, Carolyn Downing, John Leonard, Nela Brown, Steven Brown, Gregg Fisher, David McSeveney, and Christopher Shutt.

In December 2010 the steering committee sent out an open letter and an invitation to a meeting at the Royal National Theatre on February 18th, 2011, attended by over 60 sound designers from across the UK. A second meeting was held at the Royal Court Theatre and a third meeting at the Royal Exchange in Manchester. From this a constitution was voted on and the first board was elected. The Association of Sound Designers was formed as a professional association, chaired by Gareth Fry.

The ASD launched at the PLASA show on the 9th September, 2011, with approximately 90 members joining. By 2016, membership had grown to 522 members. By 2024, there were over 1,000 members.

On the 18th February 2016, the ASD became a registered charity, No. 1165633, operating as a CIO.

== Name Change ==
In October 2023, the membership chose to alter the organisation's name to The Association for Sound Design and Production. The membership of the association had for a long time included many members who were not sound designers, so this name was chosen to be more inclusive to the full membership.

== Activity ==
The ASDP has run numerous seminars for its members, on Acoustics & System Design, Production Engineering, Music, Vocal Reinforcement & Radio Mics, Sound Creation, Software-specific courses, Computer and Audio Networking, Documentation & CAD, Techniques and Approaches, Business and Work, as well as general discussions, looking at tangential topics, and many backstage tours. Over 100 of these are available as videos online for members to watch. It has also run "Winter School"s, a series of seminars run in January every few years specifically aimed at students.

They have published 19 issues of its magazine, The Echo, and have a weekly e-newsletter. The Herald.

They are an advocacy voice for its members, speaking out on a range of topics, such as backstage workers being pushed to their "breaking point". They have also worked to support the mental health of its members, as well as helping the theatre industry reboot itself after the Covid pandemic. They are involved in the Sunday Times National Student Drama Festival as a supporter of the Outstanding Contribution to the Technical Team Award. The ASDP also provide extensive resources to support new and upcoming sound designers, and work with Theatrecraft to encourage entry into the industry, as well as working hard for inclusivity in the theatre industry. In 2014 they were active in pressurising the American Tony committee to reinstate the Tony Award for Sound Design, which was reinstated in 2016.
