= Lighting & Sound America =

American entertainment technology magazine

- Editor-in-chief: David Barbour
- Categories: Entertainment Technology Magazines
- Frequency: monthly
- Circulation: 12,196
- Founder: David Barbour
- Founded: 2004
- First issue: May 2004
- Company: PLASA Media Inc
- Country: USA
- Website: www.lightingandsoundamerica.com
- ISSN: 1552-1273

Lighting & Sound America is an American entertainment technology magazine founded in 2004 and published in New York City by PLASA Media Inc, a commercial arm of the Professional Lighting and Sound Association (PLASA). Lighting & Sound America covers the broad range of the entertainment, presentation and events industries worldwide, including theatre, live touring, clubs, themed venues, corporate events and presentations, as well as in-depth profiles of people and companies involved in the lighting and sound industry.

== History ==
Lighting & Sound America was co-founded by David Barbour in 2004.

The magazine was launched in May 2004 in New York City, where it is still based now, under the editor-in-chief David Barbour, as a monthly magazine to the lighting and sound industries.

Lighting & Sound America is the sister magazine to Lighting & Sound International, and has a page count of over 100 pages.

The magazine has collaborated with other large organisations within the industry on a number of different projects, such as the 2007 Staged Events Award and the 2005 InfoComm trade show in Las Vegas and has become a valuable resource for people working in the industry.

== Circulation ==
Lighting & Sound America is circulated to 12,000 subscribers each month, the vast majority of which are in North America.
