= Figure 53 =

American software company

Figure 53, LLC
- Industry: Live entertainment, Software, Theatre
- Founded: 2006
- Founder: Chris Ashworth
- Headquarters: Baltimore, Maryland
- Key people: Chris Ashworth (CEO)
- Members: 18 (2026)
- Website: figure53.com

Figure 53, LLC is an American technology company based in Baltimore, Maryland.

Figure 53's flagship product is QLab, a proprietary cue-based multimedia playback system for macOS for use in theatre and other forms of live performance. Some of their other products include Go Button and QLab Remote.

== History ==
By the time Figure 53 was incorporated in Maryland in March 2006, QLab had been in development for over 2 years. Over time, it has evolved into an industry standard for show control.

In 2018, Figure 53 announced the acquisition of the defunct Playhouse Theatre building, and revamped it to create The Voxel theatre in 2020. The Voxel serves both as a research lab for the company and as a theatre intended to promote and facilitate technological experimentation in performance art.

== Products ==
=== QLab ===
QLab is a cue-based show control application for macOS that allows users to build and run lists of cues controlling sound, video, lighting and other media or control signals during live performances. The software is used by theatres, dance companies, touring productions, themed attractions, churches and other venues that require synchronized playback of multiple media streams.

QLab is used "behind the scenes" in theatres and other venues around the world and is characterized as an industry-standard tool for theatre technology.

=== Go Button ===
Go Button is an audio playback application for iOS devices that is designed for running sound cues in live shows using an iPad, iPhone or iPod Touch.

== See also ==
- QLab
- Show control
