= Callboard Network =

The Callboard Network was an electronic communication network operated by the University of Alberta for USITT in the late 1980s and early 1990s. Its purpose was to provide a means by which USITT members around the world, but primarily in the US and Canada, could easily communicate amongst each other. As the internet expanded rapidly during this period, it rapidly became obsolete but was an invaluable early resource for the members of the organization.

One notable event which occurred on this network was the creation of the MIDI Show Control standard between January and August 1990. This was done using the 'MIDI Forum' which was set up by Charlie Richmond. Several dozen participants from around the world logged in using a variety of means, including dialing long distance. The unique feature of this group of developers was that they never once met to discuss the evolving standard in person. It has been suggested that this was the first international standard that was created 100% virtually and is notable for that reason.
