= Show control =

Use of technology to coordinate multiple entertainment control systems

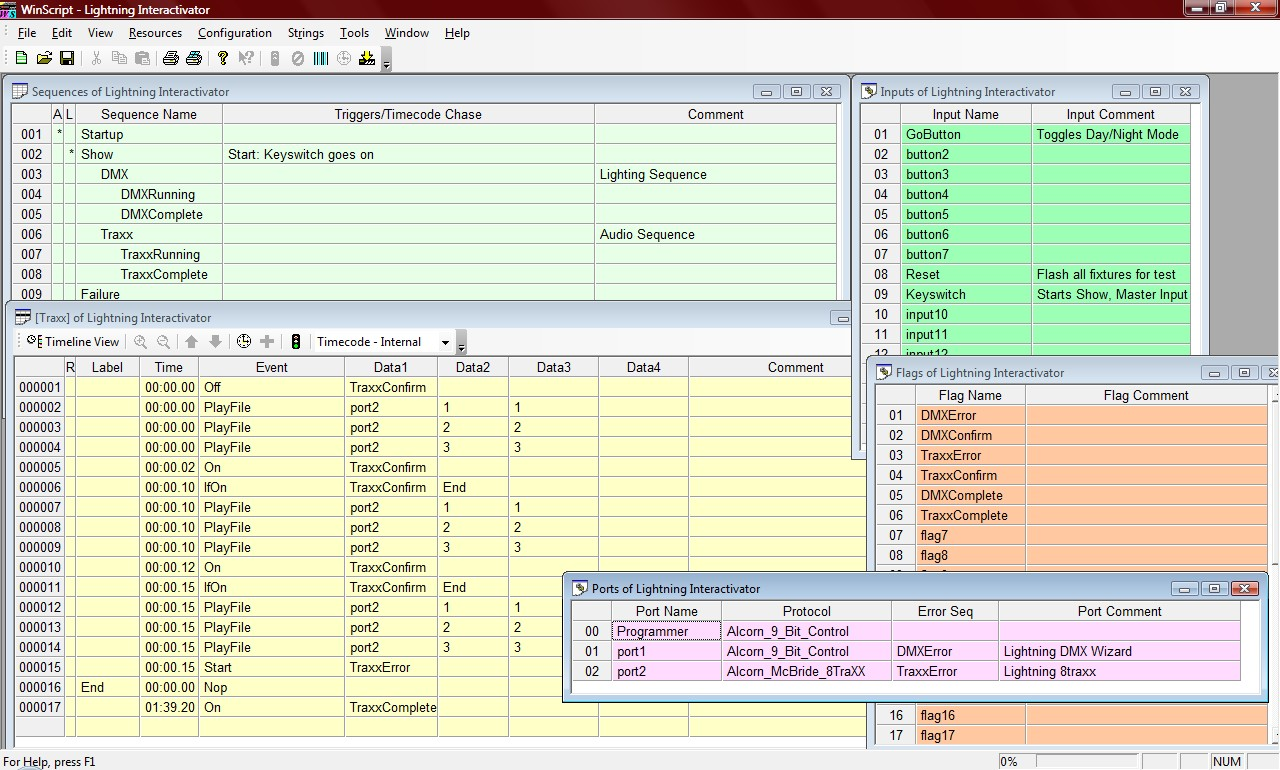
A screen capture of a common Windows-based show control program.

Show control is the use of automation technology to link together and operate multiple entertainment control systems in a coordinated manner. It is distinguished from an entertainment control system, which is specific to a single theatrical department, system or effect, one which coordinates elements within a single entertainment discipline such as lighting, sound, video, rigging, or pyrotechnics. A typical entertainment control system would be a lighting control console. An example of show control would be linking a video segment with a number of lighting cues, or having a sound cue trigger animatronic movements, or all of these combined. Shows with or without live actors can almost invariably incorporate entertainment control technology and usually benefit from show control to operate these subsystems independently, simultaneously, or in rapid succession.

== Show control networks ==
Show control networks have largely supplanted older show control typologies. This is primarily due to the maturation of the larger information technology (IT) computing industry, which, due to its scale and dominance, has produced standards, equipment and software which is less expensive than older show control equipment and methodologies and increasingly more reliable and usable in entertainment applications.

Modern systems are increasingly based upon Ethernet networking. Most manufacturers of entertainment control equipment now include Ethernet ports on their equipment. Ethernet was originally disqualified from consideration for show control because it was slow, non-deterministic, and lacked sufficient bandwidth to handle certain show control functions. These early objections have been overcome with the use of full-duplex switched Ethernet running at 1000BASE-T speeds on a dedicated local area network (LAN).

== MIDI Show Control ==
The MIDI Show Control (MSC) standard is an open, industry-wide international communications protocol through which all types of show devices can communicate. MIDI generally is a simplex asynchronous serial data transmission standard with the circuit being an opto-isolated current loop type. MIDI, an acronym for Musical Instrument Digital Interface, was originally designed in the early 1980s as a means of controlling multiple keyboard synthesizers from different manufacturers. Beginning in 1989, a group of interested theatre professionals headed by Charlie Richmond of Richmond Sound Design in Vancouver British Columbia began discussions on the USITT MIDI Forum Callboard Network. This forum included developers and designers from the theatre sound and lighting industry from around the world. They created the MSC standard between January and September, 1990. It was ratified by the MIDI Manufacturers Association (MMA) in January, 1991, and the Japan MIDI Standards Committee (JMSC) later that year, as an extension of the standard MIDI specification. It became an accepted standard in August, 1991. The first show to fully utilize the MSC specification was the Magic Kingdom Parade at Walt Disney World's Magic Kingdom in September, 1991.

== DMX512 ==
USITT DMX512-A is the current de facto standard for lighting control systems. It is an asynchronous serial data transmission standard commonly found as a control scheme between computerized lighting consoles and connected dimmers, moving light fixtures, color changers including LED fixtures, and certain effects (fog, strobes) which are usually operated by the electrical (lighting) department in theatres.

DMX512 was originally launched by USITT in 1986. It was updated in 1990 to USITT DMX512/1990. In 1998, the maintenance of the standard was transferred to the Entertainment Services and Technology Association (ESTA). ESTA revised it, and it was accepted by the American National Standards Institute (ANSI) in November 2004 as "Entertainment Technology—USITT DMX512-A—Asynchronous Serial Digital Data Transmission Standard for Controlling Lighting Equipment and Accessories". In 2011, ESTA merged with the Professional Lighting and Sound Association (PLASA), which now manages the standard. The standard is now called "E1.11 – 2008, USITT DMX512-A".

At one time, DMX was put forth as a possible show control standard, mainly by the manufacturers of lighting control consoles, but this idea was never widely adopted, due to the speed and network traffic limitations of DMX for show control applications.

== Dante, CobraNet, and others ==
Audio systems have also benefited from digital networking technology. Dante (Digital Audio Network Through Ethernet) is one of the most technically advanced means of routing high quality audio over an Ethernet network. It is a proprietary audio over Ethernet scheme using layer 3 packets to distribute uncompressed, multi-channel, low-latency digital audio in professional installations. Dante was developed by Audinate of Australia in 2006, and has since been licensed to a number of hardware manufacturers worldwide. It requires a combination of hardware and software to operate. Similar layer 3 products are RAVENNA (an open standard developed by ALC NetworX GmbH., Germany), Livewire by Axia Audio (a division of Telos Systems), Q-LAN by QSC Audio Products and WheatNet-IP by Wheatstone, most of them interoperable by conforming to AES67.

CobraNet, although an older proprietary standard dating from 1996, still enjoys a large base of installations. It is regarded as the first commercially successful implementation of networked digital audio. It utilizes layer 2 packets to distribute uncompressed multi-channel digital audio in professional installations. Its first theme park use was to distribute background music (BGM) in Disney's Animal Kingdom park. It also requires a combination of hardware and software to operate, and has been licensed to multiple manufacturers.

Interest in transferring audio over Ethernet arose about the same time the audio industry was making increasing use of digital signal processing (DSP). Sound engineers had been altering audio through various analog means for many years, but with the advent of fast, low-latency digital chips, audio signal processing moved rapidly into the digital domain.

== Time code ==
Some types of attractions operated by show control are nearly completely based upon clock-driven timing. These are most commonly found in theme parks in semi-automated attractions which are repetitious and not usually subject to variation. Certain ride systems, once manually started or dispatched, may run entirely on time code nowadays. Certain shows, such as 4-D film presentations, are also good candidates for this type of control. An example of the former is Harry Potter and the Escape from Gringotts at Universal Studios Florida and of the latter, Pirates 4-D at Thorpe Park.

SMPTE time code dates back to 1969, when the film and video tape timing standard proposed by the Society of Motion Picture and Television Engineers (SMPTE) was accepted by the American National Standards Institute (ANSI). SMPTE time code, usually a variant called LTC (linear time code), is an analog recording of a bi-phase modulated square wave, whose internal transitions encode hours, minutes, seconds, and frames.

MIDI time code (MTC) is actually a digital representation of SMPTE time code encapsulated as a series of quarter-frame MIDI messages. MTC was developed in 1986.

== Closures and ladder logic ==
The beginnings of show control technology can probably be traced to the use of relay logic in other industries, most prominently elevators. The electric elevator was invented in 1880, but it was not until about 1930 that the rise of the "automatic" elevator produced more advanced electrical controls. Entertainment has always borrowed from other industries, and various electrically driven hoists, platforms and stage elevators soon made their way into theatres and amusement parks. Automation soon followed, utilizing switches, mechanical sensors and relays to perform repetitious sequences. Early modern roller coasters used this sort of control. When industrial microprocessor devices began to supplant relay installations, more complex sequences could be realized. These devices were called programmable logic controllers (PLCs), with the first being built in 1968 for an automobile plant. PLCs were programmed using ladder logic, a language simulating relay logic.

Even today, PLCs, mechanical switches, and optical sensors are used in many entertainment control and show control applications. They are found in stage lifts and wagons in theatres, animatronics, special effects, and show action equipment in theme parks, and in ride vehicles such as motion simulators, iron rides and roller coasters in amusement parks. One of their key advantages is safety. Potentially hazardous events can be redundantly checked against multiple safety considerations before being allowed to start or operate.

== Subsystems ==
The lowest level of subsystem is an embedded system. These are typically found in single-purpose devices, such as a professional fog generator. A small microprocessor might be a part of the equipment and be used to control variables such as volume, temperature and communications with other devices. An example is these specifications for the Antari DMG-200 fog machine.

The programmable logic controller, or its cousin the small logic controller, would be the next increase in scale. These are commonly used to control subsystems which vary from moderately-sized to very large pieces of equipment. The unifying factor is that the equipment fulfills a single purpose, whether it be an animatronic figure or an entire ride system. In the earliest days of show control, PLCs were sometimes used as a show controller for an entire attraction. This is no longer done since there are now simpler and more cost-effective solutions for show control.

Entertainment control systems are the highest level of subsystem, often consisting of sophisticated, expensive controllers which fulfill a single purpose. The modern lighting control console is probably the best example of this type of equipment. Some of the largest concert and hotel-casino installations might use three lighting consoles, each with a distinct purpose.

== Systems ==
Show control systems are very widely used in theme parks as a means of synchronizing ride systems with lighting, audio, show action equipment and special effects. They are also used extensively in live shows in theme parks, such as parades, stunt shows, character shows, and special events, including large fireworks displays. They have found increasing use in live theatre, although due to their cost and the necessity for specialists to design and program them, they are mainly found in large Broadway-type productions or Las Vegas Hotel-Casino production shows. They are also seen in some of the larger concert tours, especially those featuring moving scenery, flying rigs, and special effects. Shows which are performed once or only a few times are often not considered candidates for show control since considerable preplanning and programming is usually required, but this may change as the technology, ease of operation and programming of show control software and systems matures.

It must be remembered that entertainment control does not constitute show control. A computerized lighting console controlling dimmers and lighting effects is not show control. Only when that lighting console is linked to another system, perhaps a computerized audio playback system, does it become show control.

Generally, there are several kinds of show control systems, as well as hybrid systems which may include multiple system types. In theme parks, the overall show controller is referred to as the RSS (ride/show supervisor). The operator interface in these installations is the OCC (operator control console). In the early years of usage, the RSS was probably a PLC. This began to change as entertainment manufacturers began writing software for personal computers, and/or building small, dedicated computing devices. An example of the former was the Richmond Command Cue system, which used an Amiga computer connected to a proprietary frame containing audio control and matrixing, as well as closure capability. The computer maintained multiple cue lists, and could send MSC messages to other subsystems, such as lighting consoles. An example of the latter might be the Alcorn-McBride V-16, which was programmed with a PC, but did not require one in operation. The V-16 was capable of sending cues as serial messages, contact closures, MSC, and could sync to or generate SMPTE LTC.

The Weigl ProCommander HX is a modern example for a stand-alone show controller, which is also capable of audio distribution over Ethernet by using the AES67 Ravenna protocol.
