= Lighting & Sound International =

Light & Sound International
- Editor: Claire Beeson
- Categories: Entertainment Technology
- Frequency: 11 times a year
- Circulation: 6,000+ (ABC audited)
- Publisher: PLASA Media Ltd
- First issue: November 1985
- Company: PLASA Media Ltd
- Country: United Kingdom
- Website: www.lsionline.com
- ISSN: 0268-7429

Light & Sound International (LSi) is a UK monthly entertainment technology magazine published in Eastbourne by PLASA Media Ltd, a commercial arm of the Professional Lighting and Sound Association (PLASA) and is distributed around the world in English. Light & Sound International covers the broad range of the entertainment, presentation and events industries worldwide, including theatre, live touring, clubs, themed venues, corporate events and presentations, as well as in-depth profiles of the people and companies who put it all together – and the issues affecting them.

== Operational ==
While Light & Sound International does work to promote the interests of PLASA's membership, and the activities and initiatives of the Association itself, it is not positioned as a PLASA members newsletter or as a service to PLASA members. The magazine is backed up by an editorial advisory board of respected industry professionals, which regularly feeds back ideas and suggestions for improving the content, direction and circulation.

== History ==
With the magazine reaching subscribers around the world, a digital edition of Lighting & Sound International was launched in September 2007 which is available at the same time an issue is published to benefit international readers - particularly those farthest from the UK - by offering immediate access to the magazine. It also builds a searchable online archive of issues for registered users.

In May 2004, a sister magazine was launched in the USA called Lighting & Sound America.

== Circulation ==
Light & Sound International is ABC audited and has over 6,000 print subscribers and 9,000+ digital subscribers.
