= Crash box (stagecraft) =

A crash box is a device which reproduces a crash or collision sound effect. Commonly used in theatre, they consist of a large metal or wood crate in which glassware, china crockery, wood blocks or other delicate objects are placed. The items may or may not be broken. Crash boxes can usually be used multiple times, until the objects inside of them become so broken that they no longer give the desired effect. They can then be reloaded with more breakable objects and reused. Crash boxes are used to recreate the sounds of a crash, collision or glass breakage in theatre. To recreate the sound effects, crash boxes are dropped from a height backstage. They can also be shaken to create a gentler sound effect. A crash box is generally preferred to a recorded sound effect because it is perceived as more realistic.
