= Professional Lighting and Sound Association =

Trade organization

- Abbreviation: PLASA
- Formation: 1976
- Type: Trade Association
- Headquarters: Eastbourne, UK
- Members: 1100
- CEO: Peter Heath
- Staff: 33
- Website: plasa.org
- Formerly called: British Association of Discotheque Equipment Manufacturers (BADEM)

The Professional Lighting and Sound Association (PLASA) is a trade association headquartered in Eastbourne, United Kingdom. Its membership is made up of companies involved with the events and entertainments technology sector.

== History ==
PLASA was originally known as the British Association of Discothèque Equipment Manufacturers (BADEM), a name used between 1976 and 1983.

In 2010 PLASA merged with the Entertainment Services and Technology Association. and demerged in 2015. John Simpson, the PLASA Governing Body Chair at the time, said "This has been a difficult period for PLASA but it is also an opportunity for us to refocus. PLASA has a chance to reassess its role in this industry, its relationships and communications with its members, and the future directions of its commercial activities." Also during this time PLASA Show was relocated to Earls Court and CEO Matthew Griffiths left his post.

Peter Heath took the role of CEO in April of 2016. In the same year PLASA Show move back to the West London venue London Olympia. Since then, PLASA Show has steadily regained popularity with the 2018 edition of the show being the “busiest and most vibrant show in recent history”.

== Activities ==
PLASA's activities include lobbying, organising trade show events (including the PLASA Show), publishing both technical and industry news products (such as Lighting & Sound International and Lighting & Sound America), developing industry standards and developing industry certification schemes.

PLASA performed lobbying of Ofcom and other British Government entities in the late 2000s when users of radio microphones and similar devices complained that their equipment would be rendered unusable as a result of proposed plans to auction the radio spectrum utilised by many of such devices as part of the digital television switchover.

After merging with ESTA, PLASA took on the role of maintaining the industry standards for DMX512 and RDM. PLASA have also been responsible for the development of a UK National Rigging Certificate, which launched in 2007 for individuals working in the entertainments rigging industry.

Each year, PLASA hands out PLASA Awards for Innovation and Sustainability Award. The PLASA Awards for Innovation aim to emphasise this focus on true innovation. The procedure ensures that all nominated products are vetted to show that they offer something new to the industry.

PLASA has been a part of the European Ecodesign Coalition which includes prominent industry bodies from across Europe. The purpose of the coalition has been to campaign against Ecodesign lighting regulations and propose exemptions for stage lighting.

In 2018 PLASA collaborated with Hamish Dumbreck of JESE Ltd, Peter Willis of Howard Eaton Lighting and Wayne Howell of Artistic Licence to present Plugfest, a three-day residential event in Gatwick, UK for lighting technicians and developers to test the interoperability of their products. This event returns in 2019 taking place in Lille, France.

== See also ==
- PLASA Show
- Lighting & Sound International
- Lighting & Sound America
- Association of British Theatre Technicians
- Remote Device Management (RDM)
- DMX 512
