= PLASA Show =

Annual trade show in London, United Kingdom

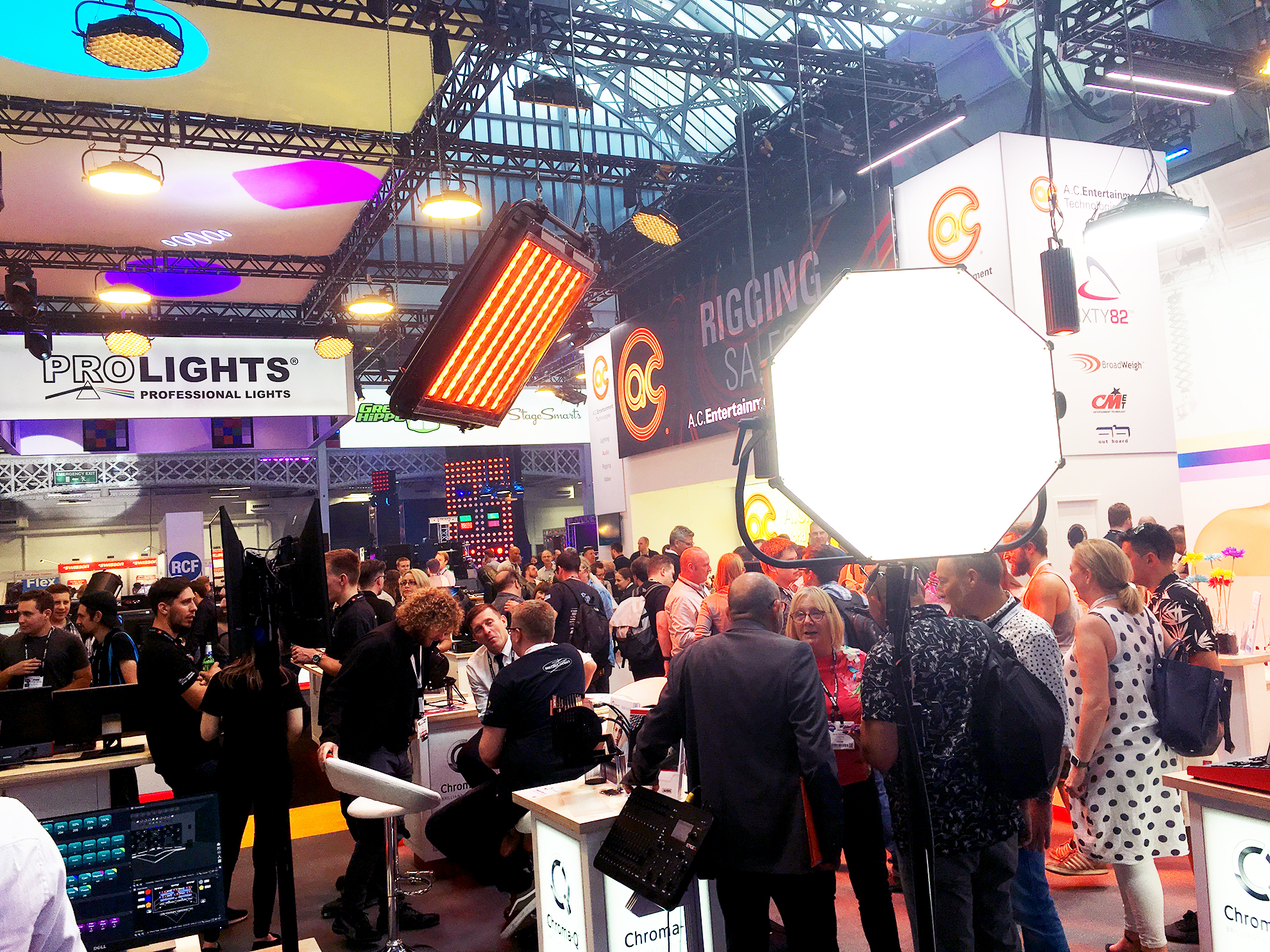
- PLASA Show 2018
- Status: Active
- Genre: Entertainments Industry Technical Equipment
- Venue: Olympia
- Location: London
- Country: United Kingdom
- Inaugurated: 1977
- Founder: British Association of Discotheque Manufacturers
- Organizer: PLASA
- Website: plasashow.com

The PLASA Show is an annual trade show hosted at Olympia and organised by the Professional Lighting and Sound Association. The show was formerly held at Earls Court Exhibition Centre and between 2013 and 2015 at the ExCeL Exhibition Centre. The show draws an international attendance of exhibitors and visitors in the lighting, audio and related technologies sector of the entertainments industry.

== History ==
The show originally started in 1977 at the Bloomsbury Crest, London, launching under the name of Discotek 77. In 1982, whilst still at the Bloomsbury Crest, it was renamed the BADEM Light & Sound Show to mirror the name of the fledgling trade association that had been set up for the sector - the British Association of Discotheque Equipment Manufacturers. BADEM was subsequently renamed the Professional Lighting and Sound Association (PLASA) and thus in 1984, the show became the PLASA Light and Sound Show. In 1985, it relocated to the Novotel in Hammersmith, then to Olympia 2 in 1988, where it stayed until 1992 before transferring to the larger Earls Court 2.

It made the move from Earls Court 2 to Earls Court 1 in 1996 and in 2007 opened the doors back to Earls Court 2 and occupied both halls. In 2013 the show moved to the ExCeL exhibition centre. It stayed here for 3 years, announcing that the 2016 show would move back to West London and be hosted at Olympia. During its time at ExCeL PLASA had been hosted during the month of October - prior to this the show was typically held during September. Upon its move to Olympia, the show moved back to September.

The show has remained at Olympia since 2016 and in 2017 celebrated its 40th anniversary “with an increase in visitor numbers, a sold-out show floor and a 25% increase in the number of audio companies exhibiting.”

The 2018 show was a further success with a “4% increase in visitors with a palpable atmosphere that was reminiscent of its popular Earls Court days.”

For much of its history, the show was run by an external events company, however in 2007, PLASA took the management of the event in-house and launched PLASA Events Ltd. which is still in operation.
