= IndigoVision =

IndigoVision Group Ltd.
- Type: Limited company
- Founded: 1994
- Headquarters: Edinburgh, Scotland, UK
- Products: IP video surveillance systems
- Parent: Motorola Solutions
- Website: www.indigovision.com

IndigoVision was an IP video surveillance systems company based in Edinburgh, Scotland, founded in 1994. The company specialized in the development of video management software (VMS), hardware and analytics. Following its 2020 acquisition by Motorola Solutions, the brand was officially sunsetted in 2024 and its technology was integrated into the Motorola Solutions Avigilon Unity portfolio.

== History ==
Originally developing generic Internet Protocol video technology under the VideoBridge brand, it later specialised in the video surveillance market. In 2000, it was floated as a public limited company on the London Stock Exchange.

More recently, it focused on large-scale IP video security systems. Products include Video Management Software, IP cameras and Network Video Recorders. Notable installations include: EuroTunnel, Amsterdam Airport Schiphol, Indira Gandhi International Airport Terminal 3 and the Canada–US border.

In March 2020, Motorola Solutions announced that it would acquire the company for £30.4 million. The acquisition was completed in June 2020.
