= Senstar Corporation =

Canadian company

- Type: Public
- Traded as: Nasdaq: SNT
- Industry: Physical security
- Founded: 1981
- Headquarters: Ottawa, Canada
- Area served: Worldwide
- Key people: Fabien Haubert, CEO; Jeremy Weese, CTO; Alicia Kelly, CFO; Matthieu Currat, COO
- Products: Video management software Perimeter intrusion detection systems Network video recorders Video analytics Access control
- Revenue: 38,5 millions $ US (2025)
- Number of employees: 126 employees (2025)
- Website: www.senstar.com

Senstar Corporation (trading as Senstar Technologies Corporation) develops and manufactures perimeter intrusion detection systems, video management software, security lighting, personal duress systems, and access control software for the physical security and video surveillance industries. Its headquarters are located in Ottawa, Ontario. Senstar products protect facilities around the world, including critical infrastructure sites, military bases, nuclear power plants, airports, personal estates, borders, and correctional facilities.

== Technology ==
=== Fiber Optic Sensors ===
Senstar's FiberPatrol intrusion detection sensors are based on optical time domain reflectometry, in which the nature and location of minute disturbances along the sensor cable are tracked and located via Rayleigh scattering. Also known as a distributed acoustic sensor (DAS), FiberPatrol is used in fence-mounted, wall-top, and buried applications. While fiber optic sensors are a well-established fence-mounted sensor technology, buried applications have received extensive attention for their suitability as a smart fence technology in high-profile applications such as the US-Mexico border.

=== Fence Sensors ===
Senstar has developed a range of fence-mounted cable-based sensors that are used in high-security applications around the world, including Canadian and U.S. correctional faculties, NATO rapid deployment camps, and seaport security.

=== Hybrid Intelligent Lighting and Intrusion Detection Sensors ===
Senstar's LM100 is the world's first hybrid perimeter intrusion detection and intelligent lighting system, combining LED-based intelligent perimeter lighting with accelerometer-based intrusion detection sensors. The Senstar LM100 is International Dark-Sky Association approved and is used in cannabis, airport, and electrical utility applications.

=== Buried Volumetric Sensors ===
Senstar's OmniTrax buried volumetric intrusion sensor is based on ported coaxial cable technology, which generates an electromagnetic detection field along the length of the buried cable. The sensor is commonly used to protect government buildings, diplomatic residences, personal estates, and correctional facilities.

=== Personal Duress Systems ===
Senstar personal duress systems are found in correctional facilities throughout North American, including those operated by Correctional Services Canada, U.S. state correctional institutions, and the U.S. Federal Bureau of Prisons.

=== Video Analytics ===
Senstar offers a wide range of intelligent video analytics products, including outdoor people and vehicle tracking, automatic license plate recognition, face recognition, indoor people tracking, and PTZ auto-tracking. In May 2020, Senstar announced its Safe Spaces product line, a set of video analytics designed to assist organizations in following public health guidelines due to the COVID-19 pandemic.

=== Video Management Software ===
Senstar sells a video management software (VMS) which it markets under the name Senstar Symphony. The software provides video monitoring, recording, event management, intrusion monitoring, and access control functionality. An open platform, it supports any ONVIF-compatible network cameras.

=== Sensor Fusion Technology ===
In 2023, Senstar launched its MultiSensor product, a compact device that uses multiple technologies to detect perimeter intrusions, with the core processing being performed by an embedded sensor fusion engine.

== History ==
Senstar started in 1981 as a spin-off from the Computing Devices Division of Control Data Canada (CDC). Its founders created Sentrax, the world's first ported coaxial cable sensor. Early adopters of the technology included the U.S. military as well as the Correctional Service of Canada, who installed the buried sensor system at its correctional facilities throughout Canada.

In 1994 Senstar was acquired by the Dornier Group of Daimler Benz.

In 1997 Senstar was sold to Magal Security Systems, which previously purchased Stellar Security Systems in 1993, a manufacturer of electrostatic field and triboelectric fence-mounted sensors. The new organization went under the name Senstar-Stellar Corporation in its North American operations, while Senstar remained the name for European operations. In 1998 Magal acquired Perimeter Products Inc., a manufacturer of fence-mounted sensors and bistatic microwave sensors, where it remained as a separate entity.

In 2003 Senstar, via Perimeter Products Inc., acquired Dominion Wireless, a manufacturer of personal duress systems, with all three organizations being consolidated in 2009 at the Ottawa headquarters under the Senstar brand.

In 2014 Magal purchased Optellios, a manufacturer of long-range fiber optic sensors, and merged the organization with the main Senstar operations.

In 2016 Senstar amalgamated with Aimetis, a Waterloo-based company specializing in AI-based video analytics and video management software.

In 2023, Magal's projects division was sold to Aeronautics Ltd., a subsidiary of RAFAEL Advanced Defense Systems Ltd. In connection to the sale, the remaining company was renamed to Senstar Technologies Ltd.

In February 2025, Senstar acquired Blickfeld GmbH, a producer of 3D LiDAR sensors.

== Industry memberships ==
Senstar is actively engaged in the security industry, with memberships in the following organizations:

- Open Network Video Interface Forum (ONVIF)
- Canadian Security Association (CANASA)
- Security Industry Association (SIA)
- ASIS International
