= Pelco =

American security and surveillance company

Pelco Incorporated
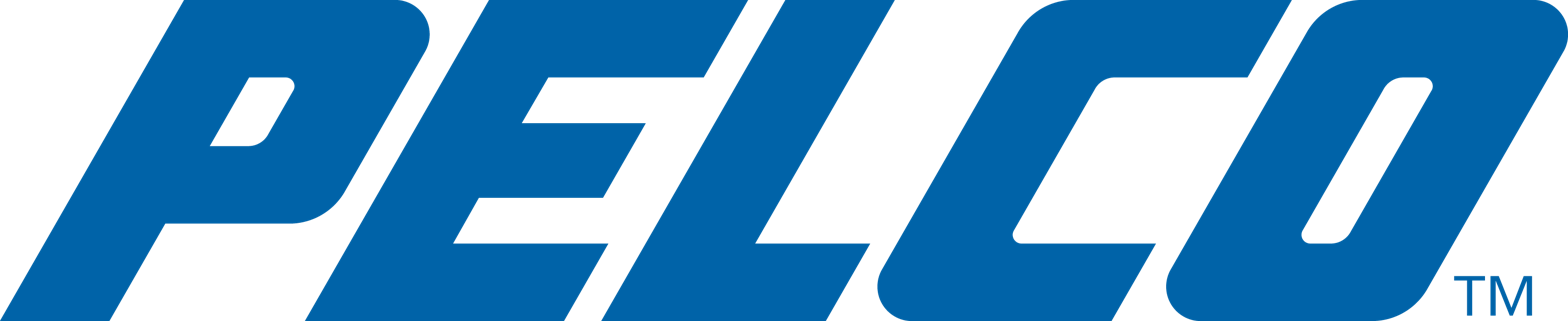
- Type: Subsidiary
- Industry: Video surveillance, video management systems, and cloud technologies
- Founded: 1957; 69 years ago
- Headquarters: Fresno, California, U.S.
- Number of locations: Global
- Key people: Kurt Takahashi (former CEO); Brian McClain (former President); Mansoor Ali; (former CFO)
- Products: Security cameras, video management systems, hybrid cloud services
- Number of employees: 21,000 (2024)
- Parent: Motorola Solutions
- Website: pelco.com

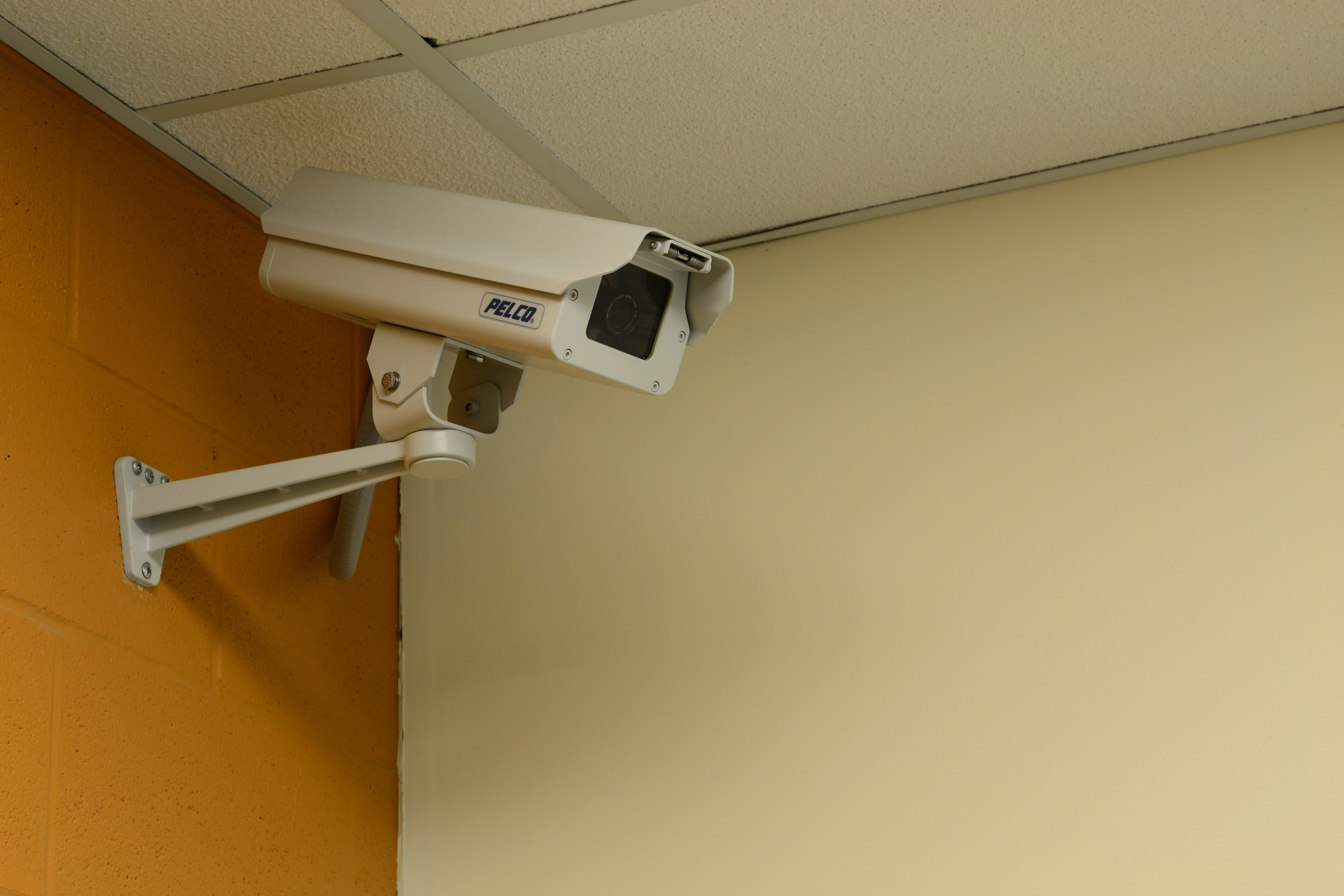
A CCTV camera housing made by Pelco.

Pelco Incorporated is an American security and surveillance technologies company. Founded in 1957 and headquartered in Fresno, California, Pelco is a wholly owned subsidiary of Motorola Solutions. The company's products include security cameras, video analytics software, smart sensors and a former video management system. Pelco is used in critical infrastructure, utilities, oil and gas facilities, and ports.

== History ==
Pelco Sales was founded in 1957 in Hawthorne, California by E.L. Heinrich. Heinrich created Pelco Sales as a side project to his already successful mechanical aviation business. Pelco Sales' first product line consisted of pan-tilt devices and joysticks designed to remotely control the position of television cameras. The demand for Pelco Sales' products grew rapidly, resulting in Heinrich's decision to abandon aviation and focus on camera technologies.

The company was moved to Gardena, California, and later to Fresno, California, to provide adequate workspace for product production. In June 1987, Rod Heinrich sold Pelco Sales to local investor David McDonald shortly after approving plans for an 80,000 square foot facility in Clovis, California. McDonald truncated the name to Pelco, in an event commonly referred to as the beginning of the "new" Pelco. The company continued to expand, reaching distribution in more than 130 countries. In 2000 the Small Business Administration awarded the company its Small Business of the Year award.

After the events of 9/11, the company financed the construction of the California 9/11 Memorial at their corporate headquarters. The memorial opened on December 8, 2001, less than three months after the attacks and includes objects recovered from ground zero, educational exhibits, and memorials with the names of the victims. In 2019, the memorial expanded with replicas of the pentagon and world trade centers.

In 2007, French electrical equipment manufacturer Schneider Electric purchased Pelco for US$1.22 billion in an effort to enhance its building automation business. Schneider Electric's ownership of Pelco ended in 2019 when Pelco was acquired by Transom Capital Group, a Los Angeles-based private equity firm. In August 2020, Motorola Solutions announced that it had acquired Pelco for $110 million in cash, which has further integrated its security products into a larger public safety and enterprise security portfolio. Today, Pelco's devices and hardware are most notably deployed to help protect Buckingham Palace, Sydney Opera House, and the Statue of Liberty. Pelco claims more than 1 million installations worldwide.

In 2023, Motorola Solutions announced that Pelco's portfolio had been expanded through the integration of technologies from several acquisitions, including Videotec, IPVideo, and Silent Sentinel.

VideoXpert Professional entered a phase-out on June 28, 2024. Motorola Solutions and its subsidiary Avigilon provided migration options to Avigilon Unity Video for on-premise deployments. Following these changes, Pelco's role was defined primarily around video security cameras and devices, while Avigilon Unity and Alta were positioned as the company's main VMS platforms.

=== Acquisitions ===
Since becoming part of Motorola Solutions, Pelco has expanded its portfolio through several acquisitions:

- Videotec (2022) – An Italian manufacturer of ruggedized cameras and housings designed for harsh environments.
- Calipsa (2022) – A UK-based video analytics startup specializing in cloud-based false alarm reduction, which became part of Pelco's cloud video services.
- IPVideo (2023) – A U.S. provider of sensor technologies, such as vape detection and environmental monitoring.
- Silent Sentinel (2024) – A UK manufacturer of long-range and thermal imaging cameras, adding specialized perimeter and defense technologies to Pelco's portfolio.

=== Rebrand ===
In 2025, Pelco underwent a corporate rebrand to align its identity with Motorola Solutions's broader video security portfolio. The rebrand included an updated logo and a refreshed product lineup intended to serve industries, such as oil and gas, utilities, ports, and other critical infrastructure. Pelco also emphasized an open-platform approach, highlighting interoperability with other security systems.

== Technologies ==
Pelco develops video security and surveillance products and is known for its pan-tilt-zoom (PTZ) cameras and specialty imaging systems. The company's technologies include PTZ innovations, AI-assisted event detection, edge-based video analytics, and cloud video integrations. As of 2025, more than 250 patents were assigned to Pelco.
