= PSIM =

PSIM may refer to:

- Physical security information management
- PSIM Software, CAD software by Powersim Inc.
- PSIM Yogyakarta, an Indonesian football club
- Maximalist Italian Socialist Party (Partito Socialista Italiano Massimalista, PSIm)
