= Physical security information management =

Category of software

Physical security information management (PSIM) is a category of software that provides a platform and applications created by middleware developers, designed to integrate multiple unconnected security applications and devices and control them through one comprehensive user interface. It collects and correlates events from existing disparate security devices and information systems (video, access control, sensors, analytics, networks, building systems, etc.) to empower personnel to identify and proactively resolve situations. PSIM integration enables numerous organizational benefits, including increased control, improved situation awareness and management reporting. Ultimately, these solutions allow organizations to reduce costs through improved efficiency and to improve security through increased intelligence.

A complete PSIM software system has six key capabilities:

1. Collection: Device management independent software collects data from any number of disparate security devices or systems.
2. Analysis: The system analyzes and correlates the data, events, and alarms, to identify the real situations and their priority.
3. Verification: PSIM software presents the relevant situation information in a quick and easily digestible format for an operator to verify the situation.
4. Resolution: The system provides standard operating procedures (SOPs), step-by-step instructions based on best practices and an organization’s policies, and tools to resolve the situation.
5. Reporting: The PSIM software tracks all the information and steps for compliance reporting, training and potentially, in-depth investigative analysis.
6. Audit trail: The PSIM also monitors how each operator interacts with the system, tracks any manual changes to security systems and calculates reaction times for each event.

== PSIM-based integration ==
A key differential between PSIM based integration and other forms of physical security system integration is the ability for a PSIM platform to connect systems at a data level, contrasting other forms of integration which interface a limited number of products. PSIM allows use of open technologies which are compatible with a large number of manufacturers. These PSIM products offer more opportunities for expansion and can reduce implementation costs through greater use of existing equipment. PSIM solutions in general are deployed to centralize information to single or multiple control hubs. These are referred to as control rooms or command and control centres (CCC, C4I, etc.). To be connected with other technologies, is an important feature of any basic PSIM as is the capability to integrate with Open Industry Standards such as (PSIA, ONVIF, ODBC, etc.)

Security systems typically integrated into a PSIM solution include:

- Access control systems
- Automated barriers and bollards
- Building management systems like Heating, HVAC, lifts/elevators control, etc.
- CCTV (closed circuit TV)
- Computer Aided Dispatch systems
- Electronic article surveillance (EAS)
- Fire detection
- GIS mapping systems
- Intercom and IP phone
- Intrusion detection system
- Intrusion systems
- Lighting control system
- Perimeter intrusion detection systems
- Power monitoring system
- Radar-based detection and perimeter surveillance radar
- Security alarm
- Video content analysis
- Video wall

== Operator guidance ==
PSIM solutions manage all of the data produced by the various security applications (where the security application manufacturers API or SDK allows), aggregates them to produce meaningful intelligence and can be enhanced with modern information management technology. This in turn is converted to create graphical situation management content; combining relevant visual intelligence, workflow based on on-screen guidance and automated tasks (also referred to as a Common Operating Interface). This is used for both event management and for day-to-day security operations. Some of the more advanced PSIM products offer dynamic guidance, which can be changed according to the perceived threat level. This threat level is governed by both external intelligence, such as DHS advice and internal intelligence, such as the number of attempted breaches. This level of dynamic guidance again relies on the level of integration achieved with any given manufacturers API or SDK.

== Typical deployments ==
PSIM solutions can be found in a wide range of industry and government sectors across the globe. The following are industries where PSIM deployments can be found;

- Corporate enterprise
- Critical national infrastructure protection
- Education
- Energy, oil & gas
- Healthcare
- Homeland defense
- Industrial & manufacturing
- Law enforcement
- Retail & distribution
- Safe Cities
- Travel & transportation

Examples of PSIM deployments:

- Atlanta Police Foundation and the Atlanta Police Department: Operation Shield Video Integration Center
- British Transport Police
- City of Baltimore: CitiWatch video surveillance program
- Ventura Police Department: Video Camera Community Partnership Program
- Washington Metropolitan Area Transit Authority (WMATA)

== Industry bodies ==
- Open Network Video Interface Forum (ONVIF): open industry forum for the development of a global standard for the interface of IP-based physical security products
- Physical Security Interoperability Alliance (PSIA): a global consortium physical security manufacturers and systems integrators focused on promoting interoperability of IP-enabled security devices
- Security Industry Association: trade association for electronic and physical security solution providers
- OPC Foundation: interoperability standard for the secure and reliable exchange of data
- SIP Forum: advance the adoption of products and services based on the Session Initiation Protocol
- BACnet: data communication protocol for building automation and control networks
