= Verkada =

Cloud-based physical security startup

Verkada Inc.
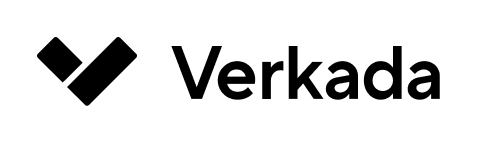
- Type: Private
- Industry: Physical security
- Founded: 2016; 10 years ago
- Founder: Filip Kaliszan; James Ren; Benjamin Bercovitz; Hans Robertson
- Headquarters: San Mateo, California
- Key people: Filip Kaliszan, CEO
- Products: security cameras, access control, environmental sensors, intrusion alarms, guest management, mailroom management
- Revenue: $806 million (2025)
- Number of employees: 1,700 (est.)
- Website: www.verkada.com

Verkada Inc. is an American security technology company, based in San Mateo, California. The company combines security equipment such as video cameras, access control systems and environmental sensors, with cloud based machine vision and artificial intelligence.

The company was founded in 2016.

== History ==
Verkada Inc. was founded in 2016 in Menlo Park, California by three Stanford University graduates: Filip Kaliszan, James Ren, and Benjamin Bercovitz, who were joined by Hans Robertson, co-founder and former COO of Meraki (now Cisco Meraki). Kaliszan, Ren, and Bercovitz had previously collaborated on CourseRank, a class data aggregation platform that was acquired by Chegg in 2010. The company installed its first security cameras in 2017, at an Equinox Gym in Beverly Hills.

In 2019, Forbes included Verkada in its Next Billion Dollar Startups list, as well as that year's AI 50 list of most promising artificial intelligence companies. In April of that year, the company announced a $40 million Series B funding round, which valued the company at $540 million.

In January 2020, the company raised $80 million in a Series C funding round led by Felicis Ventures, giving the company a $1.6 billion valuation. In spring 2020, the company launched its first access control device, the first move in a shift to moving beyond cameras, and integrating security cameras and locks onto a single platform. During the COVID-19 crisis Verkada instituted a program to offer free surveillance kits to healthcare institutions and municipalities in order to remotely monitor high-risk locations. In September 2020, Verkada expanded its product line with a suite of environmental sensors that report metrics such as air temperature and quality as well as a "people heatmaps" feature that identifies overcrowded locations within a facility.

In September 2021, the company began donating security cameras to Asian Pacific American business communities, starting with the Oakland California Chinatown Chamber of Commerce, to address growing anti-Asian threats and violence against its members.

Verkada's Series D funding round closed in October 2023 and raised $305 million at a $3.2 billion valuation. In July 2025, Verkada integrated artificial intelligence into its platform, releasing a "unified timeline" tool synthesizing data across sources to provide multiple perspectives on a single incident. A December 2025 funding round led by Alphabet's venture capital arm CapitalG brought in $100 million at a $5.8 billion valuation. At the end of 2025, Verkada had approximately 30,000 active customers.

In 2026, Verkada expanded within the EMEA market by establishing an office in Dubai. The company also announced that it would be partnering with Carahsoft to sell its security technology to government agencies.

=== Data breach ===
On March 8, 2021, Verkada was hacked by an international group including maia arson crimew and calling themselves the "APT - 69420 Arson Cats," which gained access to their network for about 36 hours and collected about 5 gigabytes of data.

Initially, it was reported that the scope of the incident included live and recorded security camera footage from more than 150,000 cameras. It was later reported that 95 customers' video and images data were accessed crimew told Bloomberg News that the hack "exposes just how broadly we're being surveilled".

In response to the data breach, in April 2021 it was reported that Verkada CEO Filip Kaliszan announced a series of measures, including red team/blue team exercises, a bug bounty program, mandatory two-factor authentication use by Verkada support staff, and the sharing of more audit logs with Verkada customers.

== Controversies ==
Starting in 2019, a group of male staff in leadership positions used the company's own facial recognition system to harass female workers, with employees telling reporters that the incidents contributed to a culture of sexism, as reported in 2020 by several media outlets. Action was only taken in 2020 once increasing media attention was cast upon the company, with Verkada eventually terminating those deemed responsible.

In April 2021, news site Bloomberg News reported allegations by former Verkada employees accusing the company of having a "bro" culture, with lax device security, excessive focus on profit, and parties during the COVID-19 pandemic. Verkada acknowledged to Bloomberg an internal lapse in judgment, and was reportedly working to create a more inclusive work environment, including reviewing gender pay equity and implementing better training.

In August 2021, Motorola Solutions filed a 52-page complaint with the United States International Trade Commission (ITC) alleging that Verkada cameras and software infringed upon patents held by Motorola subsidiary Avigilon. Verkada filed a counter-suit in the California Northern District Court in September 2021, arguing that Motorola had "sought to effectively shut Verkada's business down." On October 24, 2022, the presiding administrative law judge of the ITC issued a final initial determination finding that Verkada's products infringed upon one of three patents owned by Motorola. Both Verkada and Motorola filed for ITC review of the determination. On April 4, 2023, ITC issued a final determination finding that Verkada products did not infringe any of Motorola's three patents.

In May 2023, the Washington Post published a report that was critical of Verkada's use of facial recognition technology in cameras installed at public housing facilities, citing independent testing that found the company's technology falsely identified individuals approximately 15 percent of the time, and that it got identifications wrong up to 85 percent of the time when people were wearing masks or viewed at an angle. In September 2024, Verkada was sued by the United States Department of Justice for violating the CAN-SPAM Act, and eventually settled, paying a fine of $2,950,000.
