= Motorola Solutions =

American technology company

Motorola Solutions, Inc.

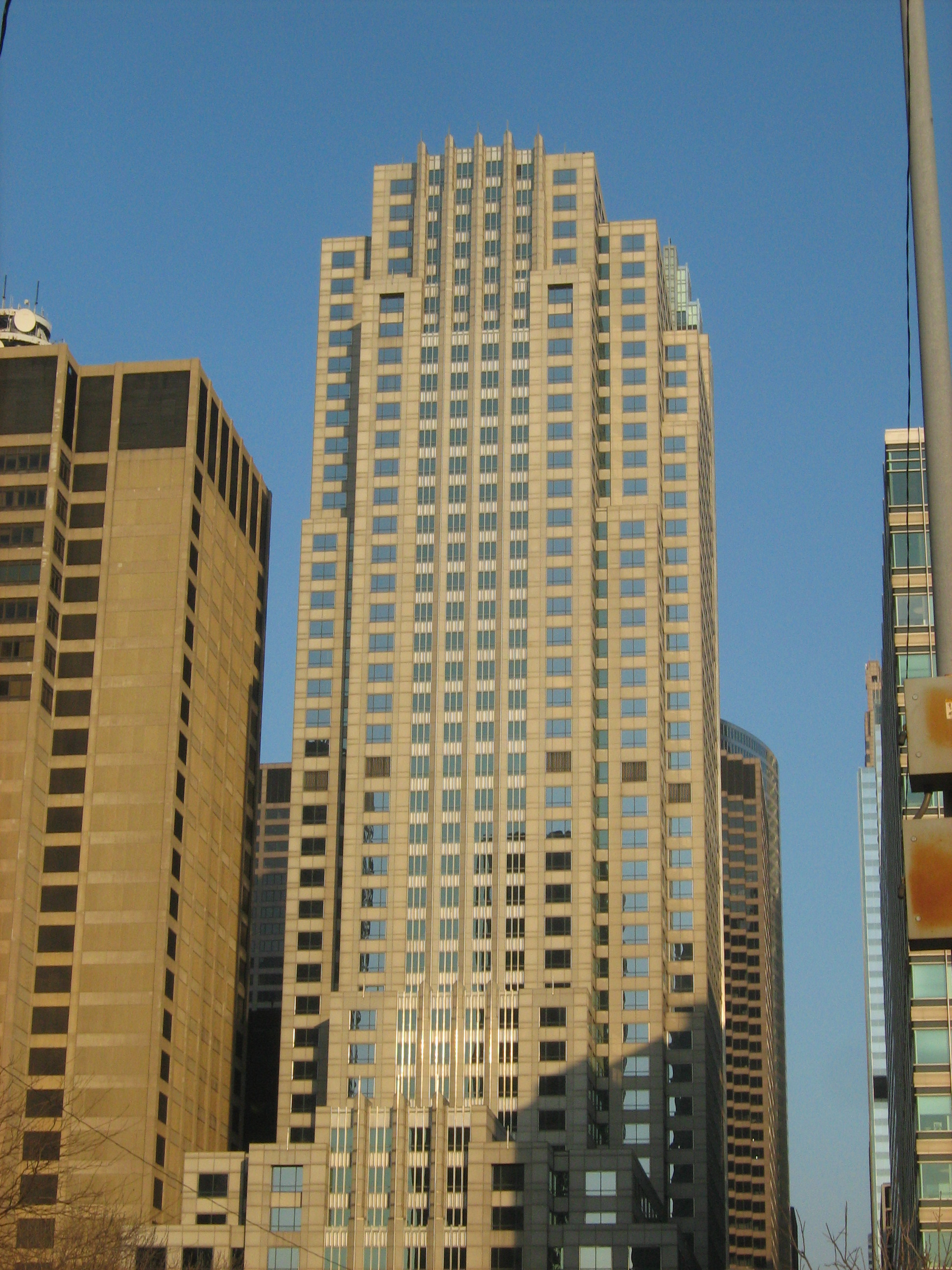
- Headquarters at Heller International Building in Chicago
- Type: Public
- Traded as: NYSE: MSI; S&P 500 component
- Industry: Telecommunications equipment
- Predecessor: Motorola
- Founded: September 25, 1928; 98 years ago as Motorola; January 4, 2011; 15 years ago
- Headquarters: Heller International Building, Chicago, Illinois, U.S.
- Key people: Greg Brown (chairman & CEO)
- Products: Mission-critical communications, command center software and video security & access control, managed & support services
- Revenue: ▲US$11.7 billion (2025)
- Operating income: ▲US$3.0 billion (2025)
- Net income: ▲US$2.2 billion (2025)
- Total assets: ▲US$19.4 billion (2025)
- Total equity: ▲US$2.4 billion (2025)
- Number of employees: 23,000 (2025)
- Subsidiaries: Airwave Solutions; Avigilon; Pelco
- Website: motorolasolutions.com

Motorola Solutions, Inc., is an American technology company that provides safety and security products and services. Headquartered in Chicago, Illinois, the company provides critical communications, video security, and command center technologies, used by public safety agencies and enterprises. It was formed in 2011 by the division of Motorola, Inc., and is its legal successor; the former company's mobile phone division was spun off as Motorola Mobility, now part of Chinese technology company Lenovo.

Motorola Solutions' offerings are grouped into three primary categories: critical communications land mobile radio (LMR) devices and networks, command center technologies to connect voice, video and data feeds; and video security including devices, AI-powered analytics and management tools. The company also provides managed services and support through a global network of operations centers.

== History ==
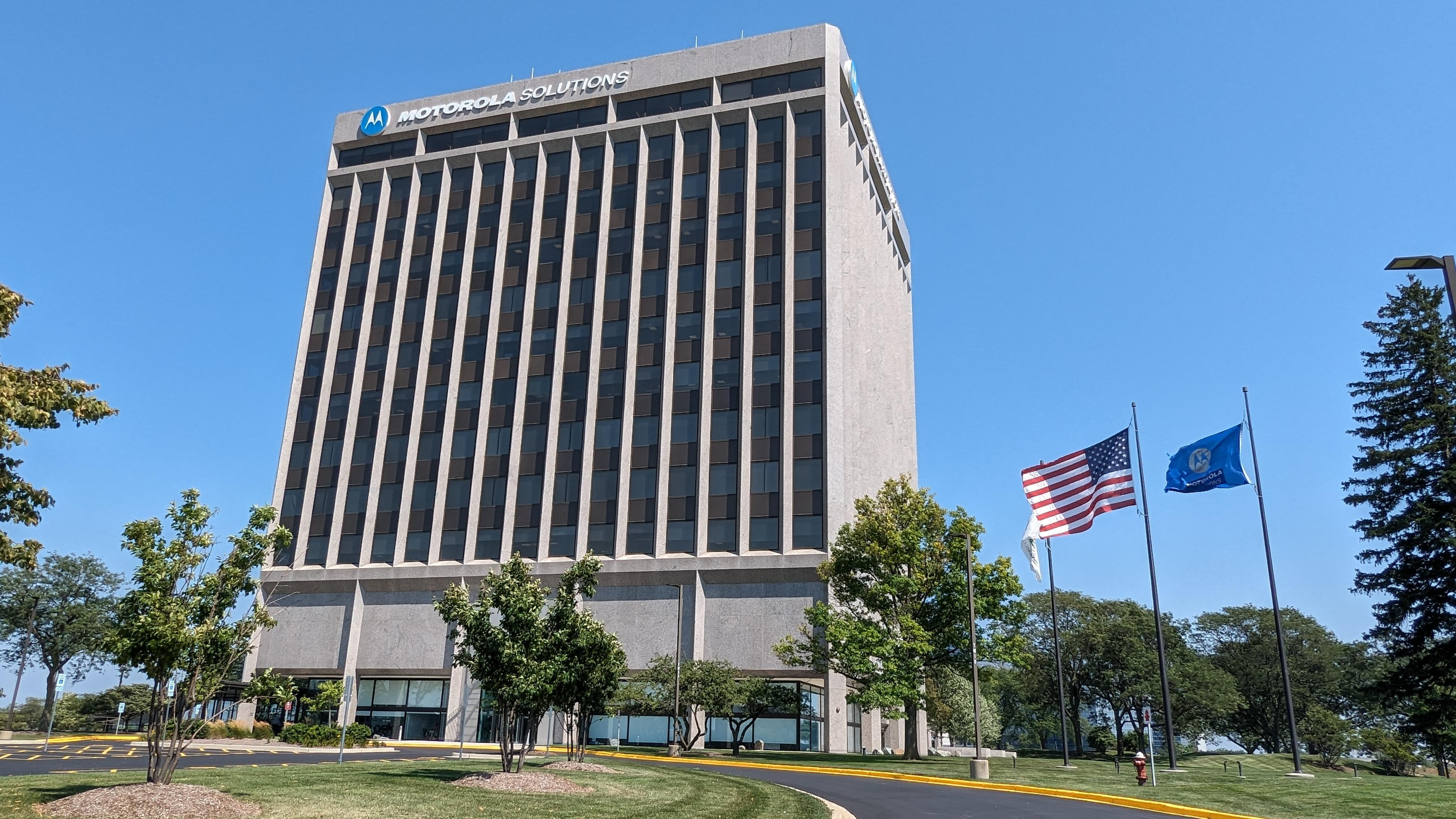
Motorola Solutions' original headquarters in Schaumburg, Illinois

On January 4, 2011, Motorola Inc. split into two companies: Motorola Mobility and Motorola Solutions. Motorola Solutions, the public safety and enterprise security side of the business, began trading as a separate independent company under the NYSE symbol MSI.

In April 2011, Motorola Solutions and China's Huawei Technologies settled a legal dispute over trade secrets, which cleared the way for Motorola Solutions to complete the sale of its networks business unit to Nokia Siemens Networks (NSN) for $975 million in cash. As part of the transaction, approximately 6,900 employees, and responsibility for supporting customers of Motorola Solutions’ GSM, CDMA, WCDMA, WiMAX and LTE products and services transferred to NSN.

In 2012, the company released the world's first handheld public safety LTE device, the LEX700 mission-critical handheld radio. The device combined rugged hardware with the ability to connect with public safety LTE, cellular, IP and P25 networks.

In 2014, the company completed the sale of its Enterprise business, comprising rugged mobile computers, tablets, and barcode scanners, to Zebra Technologies for $3.45 billion in cash. The sale included the assets of two companies previously acquired by Motorola: Symbol Technologies (acquired in 2007) and Psion (acquired in 2012). Approximately 4,500 Motorola Solutions employees from locations throughout the world were transferred to Zebra.

In August 2015, the company received a $1 billion investment from the private equity firm Silver Lake Partners, As part of the transaction, Silver Lake was granted two seats on Motorola Solutions’ Board of Directors.

=== Acquisitions ===
In January 2014, the company announced its acquisition of Twisted Pair Solutions, a provider of push-to-talk over broadband applications for secure, real-time communication on any device. Twisted Pair created an integrated communications system that allows different devices (smartphones, tablets, and PCs) to talk to each other in business, public safety, and military applications.

In February 2015, the company acquired Emergency CallWorks, a provider of Next-Generation 9-1-1 (NG9-1-1) call-taking software for public safety. The company developed technology that consolidates information from multiple 911 calls reporting the same emergency into a single source that can be shared with emergency professionals. In April of that year, it acquired PublicEngines, a crime analysis firm. The company is based in Utah and provides cloud-based solutions for data analytics of crime, predictive policing strategies, and citizen engagement.

In February 2016, the company completed its acquisition of Airwave Solutions, the UK-based operator of the British public safety radio network responsible for providing mission-critical voice and data communications to more than 300 emergency and public service agencies comprising police, fire, rescue and ambulance services across England, Scotland, and Wales.

In November 2016, the company completed acquisition of Spillman Technologies, which produces law enforcement and public safety software solutions for computer-aided dispatch (CAD) and records management systems (RMS).

In March, 2017, Motorola Solutions acquired Interexport SA.

In August 2017, Motorola Solutions announced it completed the acquisition of Kodiak Networks, a privately held provider of broadband push-to-talk (PTT) for commercial customers. Its clients included AT&T, Vodafone, KPN, Verizon, Telefónica, Bell Canada, and Vivo.

In March 2018, Motorola Solutions acquired Avigilon, a Canadian manufacturer of video surveillance equipment and software, for about $1 billion.

Also in March, the acquisition of Airbus DS Communications was finalized. In 2017, Motorola Solutions had announced plans to purchase the North American assets of Airbus DS Communications, including its VESTA platform.

VaaS International Holdings, a data and image-analytics company, was acquired by Motorola Solutions in January, 2019. VaaS's products include an image capture and analysis platform with fixed and mobile license plate reader cameras. The platform is driven by machine learning and artificial intelligence (AI) and provides vehicle location data to public safety and commercial customers.

In March 2019, Avtec was acquired. The company is based in South Carolina and develops software-based, dispatch console solutions used in the commercial transportation and utility industries, as well as in public-safety.

In July 2019, Motorola Solutions acquired WatchGuard, a manufacturer of in-car video systems and body cameras used by police.

In March 2020, Motorola Solutions acquired Lunarline, a cybersecurity and professional services firm that provides training, FedRAMP, penetration testing, and third-party assessments.

Also in March 2020, IndigoVision, a British manufacturer of end-to-end video security solutions. was acquired.

In August 2020, the company acquired Pelco Inc., a California-based manufacturer of video surveillance equipment. Pelco was previously a Schneider Electric brand.

Callyo, a cloud-based software-as-a-service provider offering mobile applications for law enforcement, based in St. Petersburg, Florida, was acquired in August 2020. It has two applications, 10-21 and Callyo, which were reportedly to be integrated into Motorola Solutions’ Command Central software suite.

In September, Delta Risk, an MSSP (Managed Security Services Provider), was acquired. The company is a Security Operations Center as a Service (SOC-as-a-Service) provider; and its ActiveEye platform provides security orchestration, automation, and response (SOAR).

In July 2021, the company acquired Openpath Security Inc., a cloud-based mobile access control provider, which supported Motorola Solutions's video security and access control offerings.

In November 2021, the company acquired Envysion, a provider of enterprise video security and business analytics for quick-service restaurant and retail industries.

In December 2021, Motorola Solutions acquired 911 Datamaster, Inc., a Next Generation 9-1-1 (NG9-1-1) data solutions provider. The company's products help ensure the precise positioning of emergency calls for faster responses from first responders.

In March 2022, the company acquired Ava Security, a global provider of cloud-native video security and analytics based in London, U.K. Ava's cloud solution provides enterprises with real-time visibility and analytics to optimize operations and detect anomalies and threats.

Also in March, TETRA Ireland Communications LTD, the provider of Ireland's National Digital Radio Service, was acquired by Motorola Solutions. TETRA Ireland delivers voice and data communications to first responders and frontline workers from national security and enforcement agencies, health and emergency services, state utilities, and volunteer organizations. Motorola Solutions was formerly a minority shareholder in TETRA Ireland.

In April, the acquisition of Calipsa was finalized. Calipsa specializes in cloud-native advanced video analytics. Its AI-powered platform is used by enterprise and security monitoring companies.

In May 2022, the company acquired Videotec, an Italy-based video security manufacturer. The company's cameras are designed to withstand the extreme conditions and hazardous environments where critical infrastructure is often located.

In August 2022, the company acquired Barrett Communications, an Australia-based HF/VHF communications systems provider. The company provides specialized radio communications for the civil security, border security, coast guard, and other government and private sectors.

In October 2022, the company acquired Futurecom Systems Group, a leading provider of radio coverage extension solutions for public safety agencies, based in Ontario, Canada. The company designs and manufactures in-vehicle, fixed, and portable radio frequency repeaters and extenders.

In December 2022, the company acquired Rave Mobile Safety. Rave, based in Massachusetts, provides mass notification and incident management solutions to help organizations and public safety agencies communicate during emergencies.

In December 2023, the company acquired IPVideo, a New-York-based smart sensor company and creator of the HALO Smart Sensor.

In February 2024, the company acquired Silent Sentinel, a UK-based rugged camera company. Silent Sentinel's security systems target the Homeland Security market. Silent Sentinel's cameras can identify anomalies from up to 20 miles away.

In July 2024, Motorola Solutions acquired Noggin, a Sydney, Australia-based provider of cloud-based business continuity planning and critical event management software.

In November 2024, Motorola Solutions acquired 3tc Software, a British provider of control room software solutions tailored for fire, rescue, and police services.

In January 2025, the company entered into a definitive agreement to acquire Richardson, Texas-based Theatro Labs Inc, a maker of AI and voice-controlled communication and digital workflow software for frontline workers. The deal closed in March 2025.

In February 2025, the company acquired RapidDeploy, a complementary cloud-native 911 solution provider for public safety, based in Austin, Texas.

In March 2025, the company entered a definitive agreement to acquire InVisit, a cloud-based visitor management solution provider, based in Calabasas, California.

In August 2025, the company completed the $4.4 billion acquisition of Silvus Technologies, a maker of advanced wireless communication systems for mission-critical applications. Based in Los Angeles, California, Silvus designs and develops software-defined high-speed mobile ad-hoc network (MANET) technology that enables highly secure data, video and voice communications without the need for fixed infrastructure. Silvus' customers include autonomous systems manufacturers, military, law enforcement and enterprises.

As part of the Silvus Technologies acquisition, the company also acquired CRFS Limited and CRFS Inc (together, CRFS), a global leader in radio frequency intelligence technology.

In November 2025, the company acquired Blue Eye, a provider of AI-powered enterprise remote video monitoring (RVM) services, based in Salt Lake City, Utah.

In March 2026, the company acquired Exacom, a Leading Provider of Cloud-Native Recording and Logging Solutions for Mission-Critical 911 and Radio Communications, based in Manchester, New Hampshire.

Later in March 2026, Motorola Solutions Canada Networks Inc., a subsidiary of Motorola Solutions, announced a definitive agreement to acquire the land mobile radio networks services business of Bell Mobility. The transaction is expected to close in the fourth quarter of 2026, following receipt of regulatory and third-party approvals and satisfaction of other customary closing conditions.

In April 2026, the company acquired Hyper, a leader in conversational, agentic AI designed to reduce the burden on understaffed public safety answering points (PSAPs) by handling non-emergency calls. This acquisition expands Motorola Solutions’ use of agentic AI across its Command Center portfolio and mission-critical AI.

In August 2026, the company acquired D-Fend Solutions, a leader in counter-drone technology, for $1.5B. D-Fend’s technology enables hostile drones to be taken over using RF (radio frequency) signals without the need for kinetic interception. The transaction adds D-Fend's field-proven counter-unmanned aerial systems (C-UAS) technology to Motorola's broader mission-critical safety and security ecosystem.

== Products ==
Products and services offered by Motorola Solutions include:

- Communications systems for police and emergency services
  - Two-way radios, including P25 radios
  - Real-time crime center systems
  - 911 call center and emergency services dispatch systems
  - Systems field response and reporting, records and evidence management, and real-time intelligence and analysis
  - Public communications apps
- Electronic security and surveillance systems
  - Video surveillance cameras, analytics software, and video management systems, under the Avigilon and Pelco brands
  - Body cameras, for police and other markets
  - Electronic access control systems
  - Automatic license plate readers
  - The HALO Smart Sensor, a combination smoke and vapor detector, gunfire locator, and surveillance microphone, intended to monitor areas where an expectation of privacy prevents the use of video cameras, such as restrooms, classrooms, and apartments in public housing
  - SentryERS, a lockdown and emergency response system
- Two-way radios for commercial applications and the consumer market
  - Talkabout and TLKR series

Product lines which resulted from an acquisition:

- Silent Sentinel, selling long-range thermal cameras that can capture up to 30 km in distance
- Cape, selling drone software enabling local and remote piloting, livestreaming, and capture and management of evidence-grade drone video

== Corporate affairs ==
=== Business trends ===
The key trends for Motorola Solutions are (as of the financial year ending December 31):

	Revenue (US$ bn)	Net profit (US$ bn)	Total assets (US$ bn)	Employees
2016	6.0	0.56	8.4	14,000
2017	6.3	−0.15	8.2	15,000
2018	7.3	0.96	9.4	16,000
2019	7.8	0.86	10.6	17,000
2020	7.4	0.94	10.8	18,000
2021	8.1	1.2	12.1	18,700
2022	9.1	1.3	12.8	20,000
2023	9.9	1.7	13.3	21,000
2024	10.8	1.6	14.6	21,000
2025	11.7	2.2	19.4	23,000

== Political activity ==
From 2024 to July 2026 Motorola Solutions spent $5 million on federal lobbying in the United States.

== Controversies and litigation ==
=== Involvement in Israeli settlements ===
On February 12, 2020, the United Nations published a database of all business enterprises involved in certain specified activities related to the Israeli settlements in the Occupied Palestinian Territories, including East Jerusalem, and in the occupied Golan Heights. Motorola Solutions, Inc., and its subsidiary company, Motorola Solutions Israel Ltd., have been listed on the database in light of their involvement in activities related to "the supply of surveillance and identification equipment for settlements, the wall and checkpoints directly linked with settlements". The international community considers Israeli settlements built on land occupied by Israel to be in violation of international law.

On July 5, 2021, Norway's largest pension fund KLP said it would divest from Motorola Solutions, together with 15 other business entities implicated in the UN report for their links to Israeli settlements in the occupied West Bank, saying it was "a very straightforward decision" given the use of the company's video security and software in border surveillance.

=== Patent litigation ===
Beginning in March 2017, Motorola Solutions filed a series of lawsuits against China-based two-way radio manufacturer Hytera in the United States, Germany, and Australia, as well as with the United States International Trade Commission (USITC). The complaints allege that Hytera is intentionally infringing on patents owned by Motorola Solutions and utilizing trade secrets stolen by three former Motorola Solutions employees who left to join Hytera. Motorola Solutions is seeking to stop Hytera from selling and importing its devices in these countries. In April 2017, the USITC announced that it had decided to institute an investigation into Hytera's trade practices. In January 2025, Hytera pleaded guilty in Illinois federal court to stealing Motorola Solutions trade secrets covering digital mobile radio technology. Hytera will be fined a maximum of $60 million under the plea agreement, and must separately pay Motorola Solutions restitution for the theft. This follows a $764M award in 2020 with a US jury verdict finding that Hytera stole Motorola's trade secrets and infringed its copyrights.

In August 2021, Motorola Solutions filed a 52-page complaint against Verkada with the United States International Trade Commission, alleging that Verkada cameras and software infringe upon patents held by Motorola Solutions subsidiary Avigilon. Verkada subsequently filed a lawsuit against Motorola Solutions in the California Northern District Court in September 2021, arguing that Motorola Solutions has "sought to effectively shut Verkada's business down". Later in September, the International Trade Commission initiated its investigation into Motorola Solutions' complaint, with Verkada stating in its response that it does not infringe upon any of Motorola Solutions' patents.

=== Antitrust litigation ===
In December 2017, Hytera filed antitrust litigation against Motorola Solutions in alleging that Motorola Solutions is engaging in anti-competitive practices that are unlawful under the Sherman Act and Clayton Act. Hytera's complaint alleges that Motorola Solutions prevents Hytera from competing in the U.S. marketplace by enforcing inflated prices and engaging in a monopolistic scheme that includes forcing LMR dealers to drop Hytera's products.

== See also ==
- Astro (Motorola)
- Dimetra
- BlackBerry Limited, formerly producing the BlackBerry lineup of smartphones and later transitioned into a cybersecurity-focused company
