= PSIA =

PSIA or psia may refer to:

- Physical Security Interoperability Alliance, industrial standardization initiative promoting interoperability of IP-enabled security devices
- Pound per square inch absolute (including atmospheric pressure)
- Professional Ski Instructors of America, an organization offering training and certification for U.S. Ski Instructors
- Philippine Software Industry Association
- Paris School of International Affairs
- Private Schools Interscholastic Association
- Palm Springs International Airport
- Public Security Intelligence Agency, the national intelligence agency of Japan
