= Insecam =

Website listing unsecured Internet cameras

- Website type: Web directory
- Country of origin: Russia
- Website: insecam.org
- Launched: 2014
- Current status: Active

Insecam (Note: Sometimes stylized as InSeCam.) is a Russian-based directory website that lists unsecured live IP surveillance and CCTV cameras with a default password. Launched by an anonymous programmer in 2014 with the stated goal of bringing awareness to password security, the site initially had around 73,000 listed cameras across 152 countries. Users can use several categorizations to find cameras from specific manufacturers, countries, or locations. As of 2025, over 2,000 live feeds could still be accessed.

Insecam made headlines in November 2014, with media outlets often criticizing it for invading people's privacy and being a possible tool for voyeurism. Members of the United States and United Kingdom governments also expressed concerns over its ability to stalk citizens. The creator wiped the site's functionality and attempted to find a remote programming job, but brought it back the same month with cameras now being manually filtered to remove live feeds from homes.

== History ==
Insecam was created by an anonymous programmer in 2014. He was inspired by similar ideas that "appeared a few years ago", but went largely unrealized until he decided to create a website with his own "free time". Directories created before Insecam were often presented as Pastebin documents or marked locations on Google Maps. The site is hosted in Russia, though HuffPost has suggested it was "not necessarily created in" the country. Its creator has stated his goal was "to show the importance of the security settings," hoping that the directory would motivate more consumers to change the default passwords on their cameras. According to Insecam's creator, the website averaged "about 3,000-4,000 online users" during its peak in November 2014, and hosted around 73,000 unique camera feeds across 152 countries. TechCrunch reported that by November 7, many cameras in the directory had stopped working, likely as a result of increased attention received worldwide. Sixteen days later, the website was replaced with the message "Programmer looking for a good remote job", including a list of skills and an email address for contact. On November 25, Insecam returned to its original domain (insecam.cc) and resumed hosting live camera feeds, claiming that all cameras were now manually selected so they would not "invade anybody's private life." The site has since returned to using insecam.org.

In a 2018 study, three researchers collected the history records of all cameras ever streamed on Insecam, finding that at least 560,293 unique cameras have been on the website, with 290,344 still maintaining a webpage. Using the assumption that all IP information on the site is correct, they estimated that "about 20,000 to 25,000 active cameras" were shown, with an average of 215 new cameras added every day. As of 2025, the total amount of active cameras has shrunk to over 2,000.

== Features ==
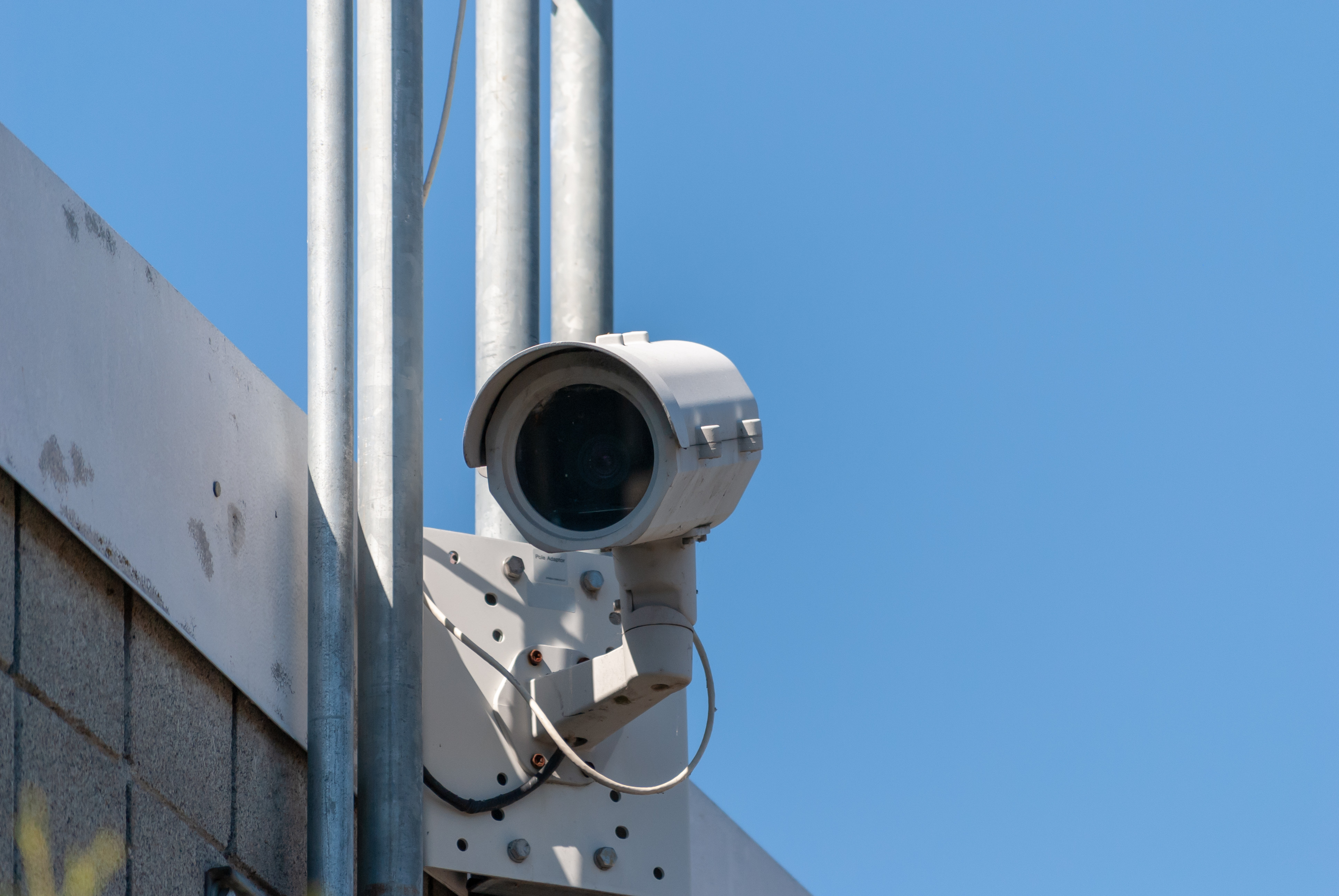
Insecam acts as a directory for publicly accessible cameras, such as this CCTV camera.

Insecam is a web directory that lists cameras streaming on publicly accessible network ports, and are often CCTV or IP-based cameras that still use default passwords. In 2014, most featured cameras were from major manufacturers like Foscam and Panasonic. The site organizes cameras into multiple categories, such as their manufacturer, country, or popularity. Cameras can also be sorted based on their surrounding scenery, such as being located in a farm or facing traffic. Each feed includes the camera's latitude and longitude markers alongside its location on Google Maps.

Journalists noted the variety present in Insecam's directory. Vice's Daisy Jones stated cameras on the site could contain "Churches, restaurants, farms, streets, bars, private gardens, beaches, [or] barber shops", and recounted watching "Taiwanese hairdressers" and "Israeli bakeries" to exemplify the numerous available countries.

== Reception ==
Insecam received a surge of media coverage in November 2014. The earliest known article regarding the website was published by Vice Motherboard on November 1, though its author, Joseph Cox, chose to keep the site unnamed. Cox called it "one of the latest, and perhaps biggest, examples of a trend wherein security researchers risk people’s personal privacy under the justification of exposing security issues," arguing that such practices can "harm the public at large." He also criticized the site's monetization through advertisements.

According to Alex Hern of the Guardian, reception was mixed on social media sites like Reddit; initial viewers of a thread linking to Insecam found the concept to be creepy, but later on, other users began sharing screenshots and links to cameras that showed women in compromising positions, such as masturbating or vacuuming in revealing clothing, who were unaware that they were being watched. Publications like Gizmodo expressed concerns that the site enabled voyeurism. A concern expressed by users, as well as media outlets like NetworkWorld, was the prevalence of cameras located in nurseries. This stemmed from the site's usage of Foscam-manufactured cameras, which many parents used to monitor their children. Foscam later told Vice Motherboard that their security protocols now required users to change their default logins.

Increased media coverage of Insecam caused governments to issue statements regarding the website, including general webcam safety. On November 20, the U.S. Federal Trade Commission warned against webcam hackers and urged wireless camera owners to take extra security measures, such as changing the camera's default password or switching to the Wi-Fi Protected Access 2 (WPA2) security protocol. That same day, the United Kingdom's data protection watchdog explicitly condemned Insecam, and then-information commissioner Christopher Graham moved to shut down the website, citing privacy concerns. In response to allegations that they were responsible for the direct hacking of live camera feeds, the website assured that all available cameras were mirrored from different locations online, which could already be watched publicly.
