= Rave Mobile Safety =

American software company

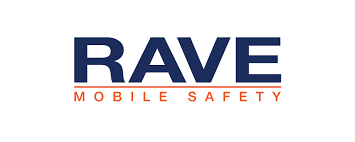
- Type: Subsidiary
- Industry: Software
- Predecessor: Rave Wireless
- Founded: New York City, New York (2004)
- Headquarters: Framingham, Massachusetts
- Products: Rave Alert; Rave Guardian; Rave Panic Button; Rave 911 Suite; Rave Eyewitness; Smart911
- Parent: Motorola Solutions
- Website: HTTPS://motorolasolutions.com/

Rave Mobile Safety (formerly Rave Wireless) was an American software company founded in New York City in 2004, and was acquired by Motorola Solutions, Inc. in December 2022. The company provided a suite of software applications for safety. Early investors included Bain Capital Ventures, Sigma Partners, and RRE Ventures. More recently, Technology Crossover Ventures took a lead investment position

As of 2021, the company reported approximately 8,000 contracted clients, including 1,800 higher education institutions, 10,000 K-12 schools, and 3,000 public safety agencies and 9-1-1 centres across all 50 US states, covering more than 50 million individuals.

== History ==
Initially the company was focused primarily on higher education institutes and offered customized mobile phone services and associated services. Their first customer was Montclair State University in NJ, which won the Jeanne Clery Campus Safety award for their implementation of the Rave Guardian product. The company subsequently focused on safety applications, expanding its portfolio to serve emergency management agencies, corporate safety offices, law enforcement and schools.

In 2015, the company announced a new product, Rave Panic Button, which was launched in Everett (WA) Schools, in Snohomish County, Washington. Schools across both Nassau and Suffolk Counties in NY have used it.

In 2017, the company expanded into Canada, acquiring ERMS, a Canadian emergency notification provider.
