= 500 West Monroe =

Office skyscraper in Chicago, Illinois

500 West Monroe Building
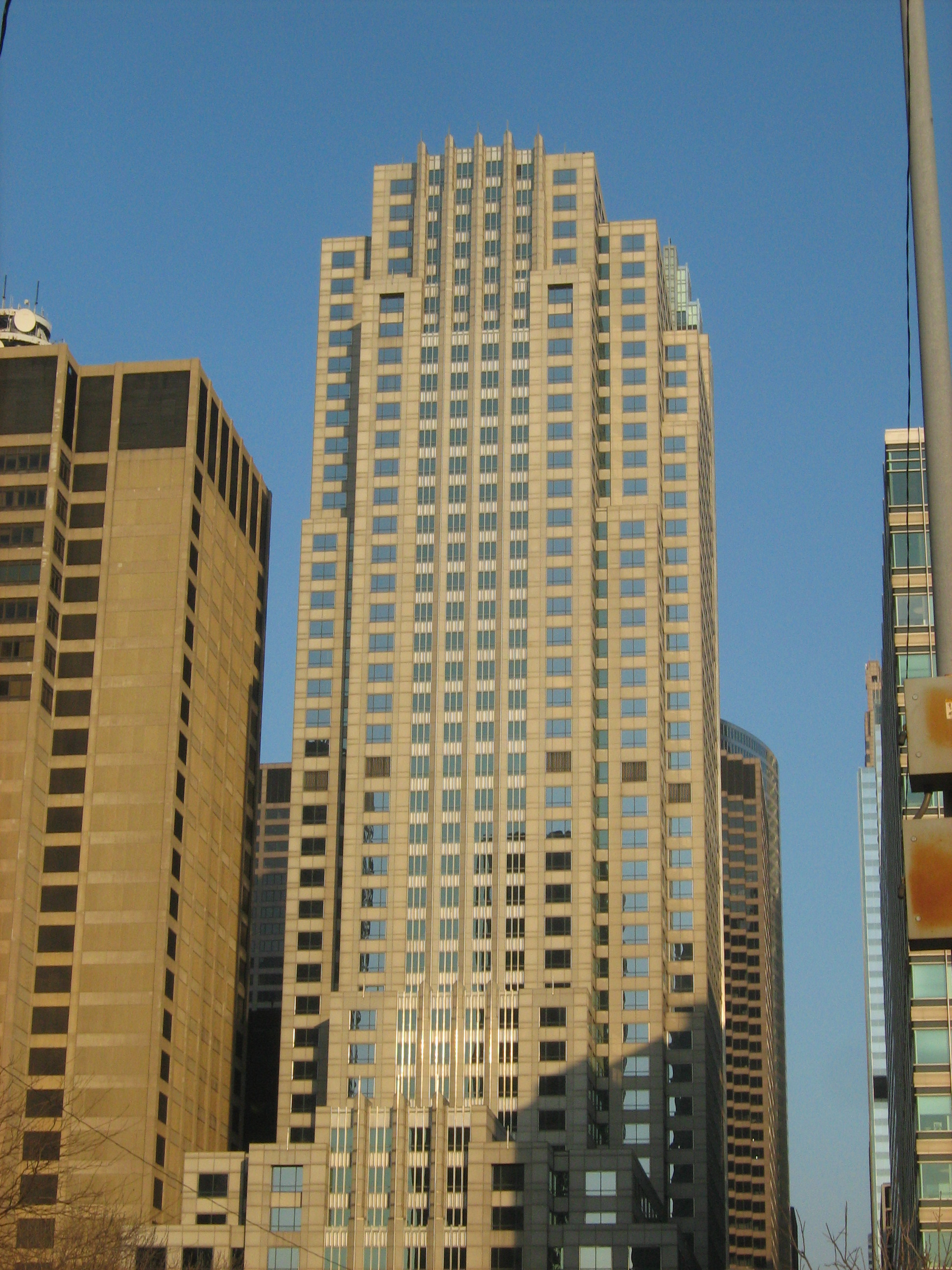
- Interactive map of the 500 West Monroe Building area

General information
- Status: Completed
- Type: Office
- Location: 500 West Monroe Street, Chicago, Illinois, United States
- Coordinates: 41°52′51″N 87°38′26″W
- Construction started: 1990
- Completed: 1992
- Opening: 1992

Height
- Roof: 600 ft (180 m)

Technical details
- Floor count: 45
- Floor area: 966,377 sq ft (89,779.4 m^{2})

Design and construction
- Architect: Skidmore, Owings & Merrill
- Developer: Tishman Speyer Properties

The 500 West Monroe Building (previously Heller International Building) is a skyscraper in Chicago, Illinois. The building rises 600 feet (183 m) in Chicago's Near West Side neighborhood. It contains 45 floors, and was completed in 1992. The 500 W Monroe Building currently stands as the 44th-tallest building in the city. The architectural firm who designed the building was Skidmore, Owings & Merrill, the same firm who designed Chicago's Sears Tower and John Hancock Center and the Burj Khalifa in Dubai.

The 500 West Monroe Building was the tallest building in Chicago situated west of the Chicago River at the time of its construction. It lost the title of the tallest building in Chicago west of the Chicago River with the completion of construction on River Point in 2017.

One year after its completion, in 1993, the building won the "Best Structure Award" from the Structural Engineers Association of Illinois. The building's design incorporated a unique turret-like structure on the structure's southeastern corner. The turret stands as the building's highest architectural point, and is illuminated in white lights at night.

== Tenants ==
- GE Healthcare
- GE Transportation
- Motorola Solutions

== See also ==
- List of tallest buildings in Chicago
- Chicago architecture
