= GE HealthCare =

American multinational medical technology company

GE Healthcare Technologies, Inc.

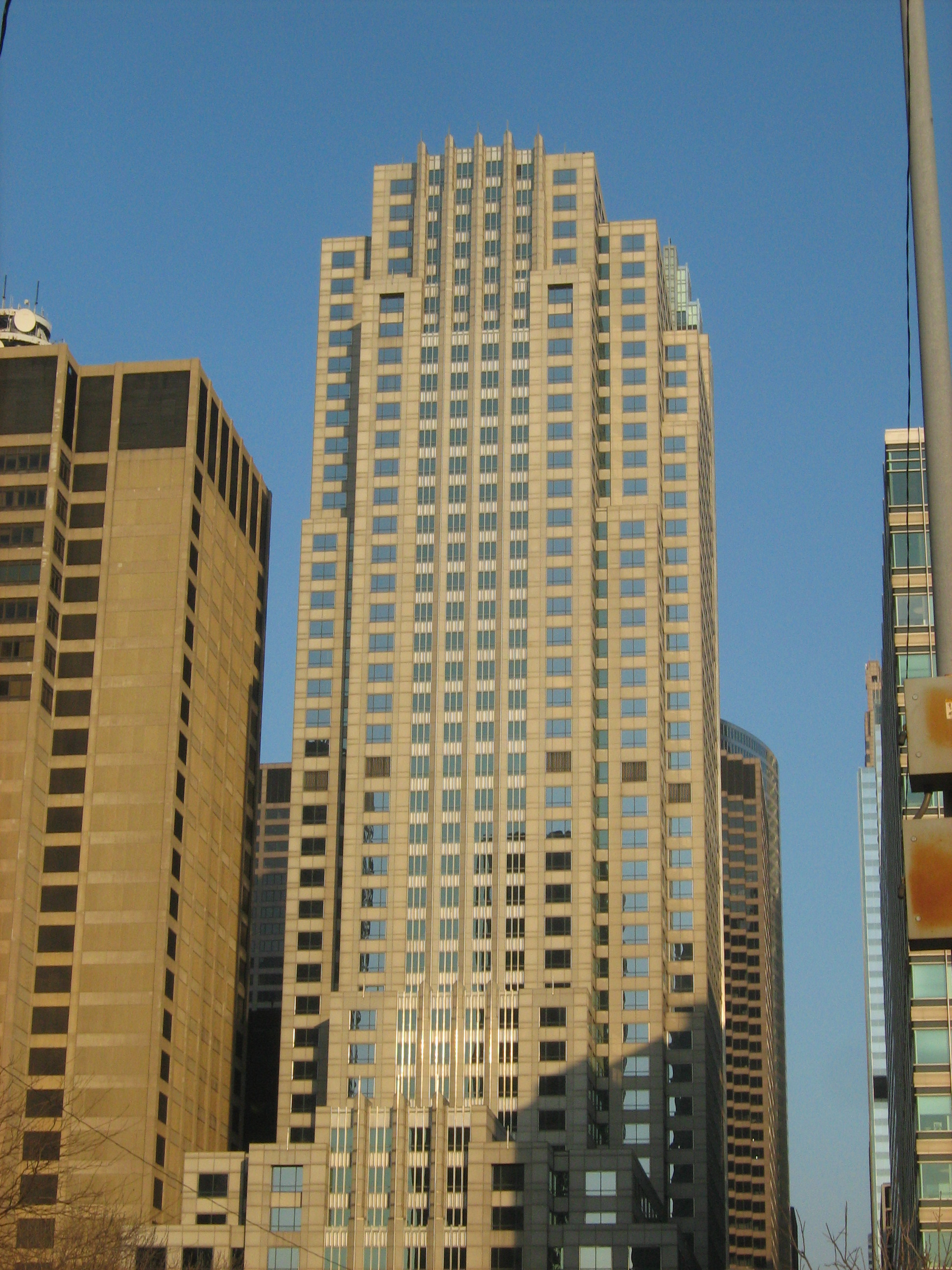
- Headquarters at Heller International Building in Chicago
- Type: Public
- Traded as: Nasdaq: GEHC; Nasdaq-100 component; S&P 500 component
- Industry: Healthcare
- Founded: September 28, 1994; 32 years ago (as a subsidiary); May 16, 2022; 4 years ago (formation of corporate entity); January 4, 2023; 3 years ago (spin-off from GE)
- Headquarters: Heller International Building, Chicago, Illinois, United States
- Area served: Worldwide
- Key people: Peter Arduini (CEO); Larry Culp (chairman)
- Revenue: ▲US$20.6 billion (2025)
- Operating income: ▲US$2.76 billion (2025)
- Net income: ▲US$2.08 billion (2025)
- Total assets: ▲US$36.9 billion (2025)
- Total equity: ▲US$10.4 billion (2025)
- Number of employees: c. 54,000 (2025)
- Website: gehealthcare.com

GE Healthcare Technologies, Inc., stylized GE HealthCare, is an American health technology company based in Chicago, Illinois. It operates four divisions: Medical imaging, which includes molecular imaging, computed tomography, magnetic resonance, women’s health screening and X-ray systems; ultrasound; Patient Care Solutions, which is focused on remote patient monitoring, anesthesia and respiratory care, diagnostic cardiology, and infant care; and Pharmaceutical Diagnostics, which manufactures contrast agents and radiopharmaceuticals.

GE HealthCare's primary customers are hospitals and health networks. In 2023, the company received 42% of its revenue in the United States and 13% of its revenue from China, where the company faces increasing competition.

GE HealthCare was originally the healthcare division of the American conglomerate General Electric (GE), which spun it off in 2023 as an independent, publicly traded company. It operates in more than 100 countries, with GE HealthCare major regional operations in Buc (suburb of Paris), France; Helsinki, Finland; Kraków, Poland; Budapest, Hungary; Yizhuang (suburb of Beijing), China; Hino & Tokyo, Japan, and Bangalore, India. Its biggest R&D center is in Bangalore, India, built at a cost of $50 million.

== History ==
=== Founding and early growth ===
GE HealthCare traces its roots to the Victor Electric Company, founded in 1893 in a basement by Charles F. Samms and Julius B. Wantz, previously employees of the assembly lines at the Knapp Electrical Works and Midland Electric Co. and then in their early 20s. They initially focused on supplies for the dental industry. At the time, they were a six-person operation.

By 1896, one year after Wilhelm Röntgen's discovery, Victor Electric entered the business for X-ray machines. The business expanded rapidly and so, in 1896, the company moved into new premises three times the original size. By 1896, the company also made electrostatic generators for exciting X-ray tubes and electrotherapeutic devices.

By 1903, Victor Electric had outgrown its facilities at 418 Dearborn St. in Chicago and acquired two floors of a building at 55 Market Street, Chicago. This was again only a temporary stop; by 1910 it was too small and the firm moved again in 1911 to a building at the corner of Jackson Blvd. and Damen Avenue. This was the first permanent home of Victor Electric Co. They stayed there 35 years and during this time, gradually acquired all the space in the building and several around it.

In 1916, the company merged with three companies: Scheidel Western, Snook-Roentgen, MacAlaster & Wiggin. Victor's two founders had key roles in the new firm; Charles F. Samms was company president and Julius B. Wantz was Vice-President of manufacturing and engineering.

=== Acquisition by General Electric ===
In 1920, GE HealthCare entered the imaging technology business with the acquisition of Victor Electric Company, founded in 1893. By 1930 it was renamed to GE X-Ray; Before the introduction of the CT scanner in the 1970s and the MRI scanner in the 1980s, it declined to around 2% of GE's sales among the 120 departments in the conglomerate.

In the 1990s the department began to diversify into various medtech businesses and executed 94 acquisitions between 1995 and 2017. It also continued to invest in research and development, with over 3800 patents between 2000 and 2009.

=== Moving from X-Rays to Medical as GE Medical System ===
Use of X-rays in industry for non-destructive testing of war materials increased during World War II. X-rays were broadly used as a medical tool for military services.

As the war ended, GE X-Ray Corporation continued to grow. Greater production capacity and greater expertise was needed in the core business of building X-ray tubes. Since the tubes were made from hand-blown glass, the decision was made to move the company 90 miles north to Milwaukee, Wisconsin, in order to tap into the enormous amount of glass-blowing talent in Milwaukee's beer-brewing industry.

In 1947, the company moved from Jackson Blvd. in Chicago to a 43-acre (170,000 m^{2}) site in the city of West Milwaukee, which had been used for building turbochargers during the war. The street was renamed Electric Avenue.

In 1951, the corporate structure was dissolved and the name changed to General Electric X-Ray Department. This new name lasted less than 10 years as the department divested itself of its industrial X-ray business, widened its medical business, and took on the name of GE Medical Systems Department. One of the reasons for the name of Medical Systems was due to the increase in the electro-medical business, which began in 1961 with the introduction of patient monitoring equipment. By 1967 modular equipment was developed which was soon popular in cardiac and intensive care units.

Early in 1960, pacemakers were developed in Corporate Research & Development in Schenectady, New York, and in 1969 the Standby Pacemaker was developed. In 1968, the Biomedical Business Section opened its first factory in Edgerton Avenue. Late in 1970 a surgical package was introduced and in 1971, equipment to monitor blood gasses during surgery was introduced.

Later in 1971, Biomedical opened a 9,000 square meter admin and engineering building opposite its factory and in 1972, the section was renamed The cardio-Surgical Product Section. With the growth of its medical business, the General Electric Company upgraded the department to The Medical Systems Division in 1971. Also in 1971, a major expansion programme was started and the Waukesha factory was planned. Work started in July 1972, and was completed in 1973.

In the 1970s, CT scanners were introduced, followed by MRI machines in the 1980s, and GE became a major manufacturer of both. The department, named GE Medical Systems (GEMS), grew rapidly under the management of Jack Welch, establishing international partnerships and acquisitions. It expanded to sell globally, including various partnerships and acquisitions, growing to 50% sales outside the USA by 1988.

=== Growth in the 1980s as GE Medical Systems ===
In 1982, the company set up a joint venture with Yokogawa Electric. It changed its name to GE HealthCare Japan Corporation in 2009.

In 1983, GE Medical started investing heavily in Magnetic Resonance Imaging (MRI) technology, investing nearly US$1 billion in a new plant in Waukesha. It developed the MR Signa, which became very successful. Up to this time, the medical Systems Division had simply been divided into domestic and international, but in 1987 it reorganized into the three "poles" of America, Europe and Pacific.

In 1985 GE acquired Technicare from Johnson and Johnson. Originally named Ohio Nuclear (and in 1979, after another fusion, Ohio Nuclear Unirad), the name was changed to Technicare in 1982. Technicare (with headquarters in Cleveland, Ohio) had been producing a range of rotate-stationary CTs with an installed base in the thousands, as well as some X-ray diagnostic equipment and a nascent MRI product range.

In 1988, GE Medical Europe merged with CGR (Compagnie Générale de Radiologie), a medical equipment supplier based in France, to form General Electric CGR Medical Systems. The European headquarters were moved from Hammersmith (UK) to Buc, Yvelines, near Paris.

=== Expanding in the 1990s as GE Medical Systems ===
In 1920, Victor was acquired by General Electric and was renamed VICTOR X-RAY CORPORATION. At that time, it was the largest manufacturer of X-ray tubes.

The merger of the Victor subsidiary and General Electric closed on July 28, 1926 and the company became "General Electric X-Ray Corporation". The merger brought renewed vitality to the organization and Victor entered the foreign market with equipment sold and serviced in nearly 70 countries. In 1930, the Victor name was phased-out from all branding; however, advertisements did mention "formerly Victor X-Ray Corporation".

In 1974, work on CT was started and the first CT machine was installed in 1976. In June 1980, the company acquired the CT scanner business of EMI.

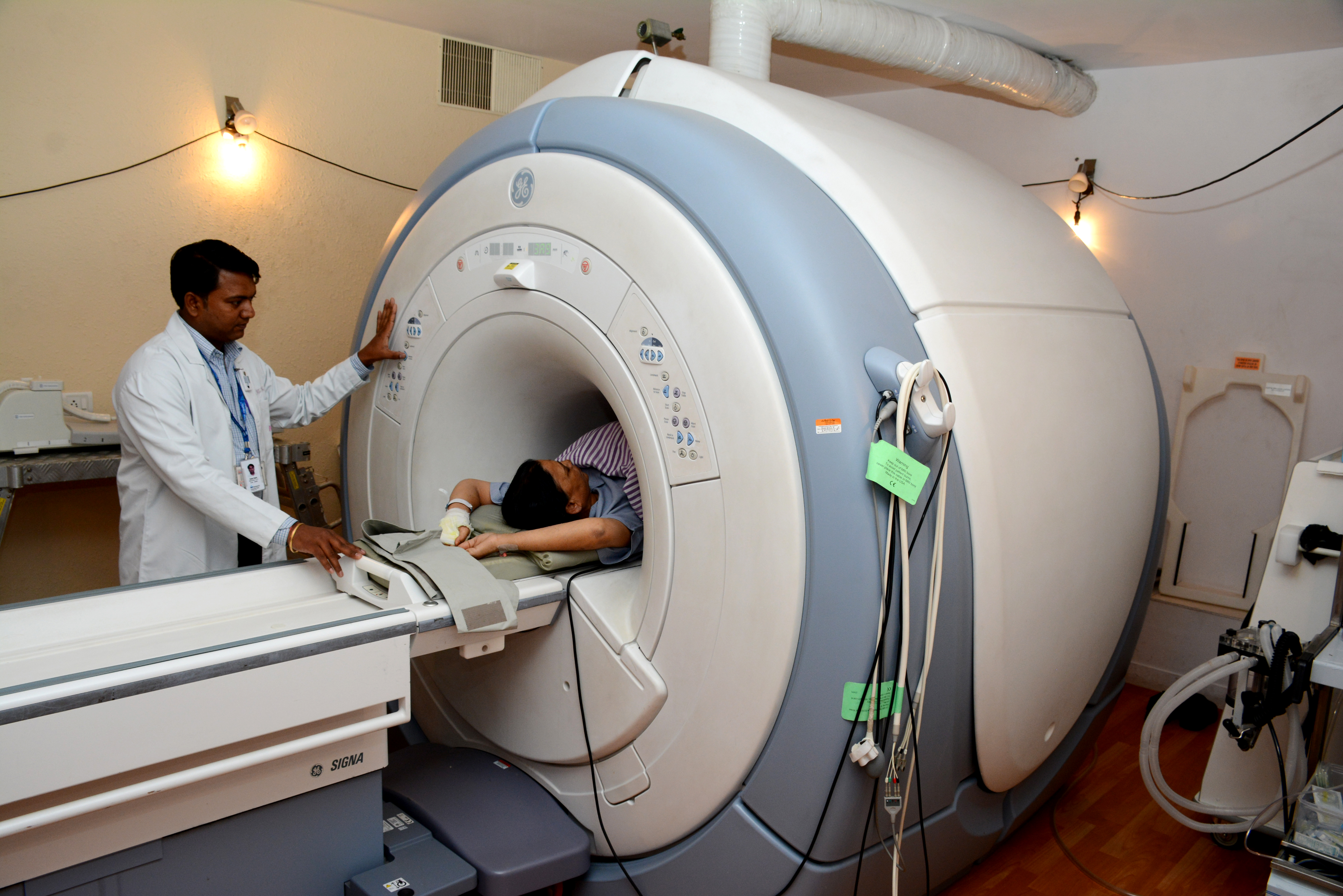
GE Signa series MRI Scanner, used at Narayana Multispeciality Hospital, Jaipur

The MRI magnet plant in Florence, South Carolina, was opened a short time later, giving GE its own magnet production. It underwent a $40 million expansion in 2017.

GE HealthCare was incorporated in 1994.

In 1992, GE acquired the Picker Service organization in the U.K.

In 1994, it changed the name in Europe from GE-CGR back to General Electric Medical Systems.

In September 1995, the company acquired Resonex, an MRI maker based in Fremont, California.

In 1996, Jeff Immelt was named CEO of the company; he became CEO of GE in 2000.

In April 1998, the company acquired Diasonics Vingmed from Elbit Medical Imaging of Haifa, Israel, expanding its ultrasound imaging business.

In September 1998, the company acquired Marquette Medical Systems for $808 million.

In November 1998, the company acquired the Nuclear and MR businesses of Elscint, (then a division of Elron, based in Haifa, Israel), for $100 million.

=== 21st century and renaming to GE HealthCare ===
==== 2000–2005 ====
In September 2000, the company acquired the remaining 50% of the ELGEMS joint-venture formed with Elscint in 1997.

In 2001, the company acquired San Francisco, California–based CT maker Imatron for $210 million. Imatron produced an Electron beam tomography (EBT) scanner that performs imaging applications used by physicians specializing in cardiology, pulmonology and gastroenterology. The Imatron business was later incorporated into GE HealthCare's Diagnostic Imaging business segment.

In March 2002, the company acquired MedicaLogic, creator of the former Logician, an ambulatory Electronic Medical Records system, for approximately $32 million.

In April 2002, GE HealthCare acquired Visualization Technology, a manufacturer of intra-operative medical devices and related products for use in minimally invasive image guided surgery, based in Boston.

In January 2003, the company acquired Millbrook Corporation, maker of Millbrook Practice Manager, a billing and scheduling system for doctors' offices.

GE HealthCare IT later merged the two products into one, although the stand-alone EMR product is still available and in development.

In 2003, GE HealthCare acquired Instrumentarium, including its Datex-Ohmeda division, a producer, manufacturer, and supplier of anesthesia machines and mechanical ventilators. To satisfy regulatory concerns in the United States and in Europe, GE HealthCare was forced to divest Instrumentarium's Ziehm Imaging mobile C-arm business, as well as its Spacelabs patient-monitoring unit.

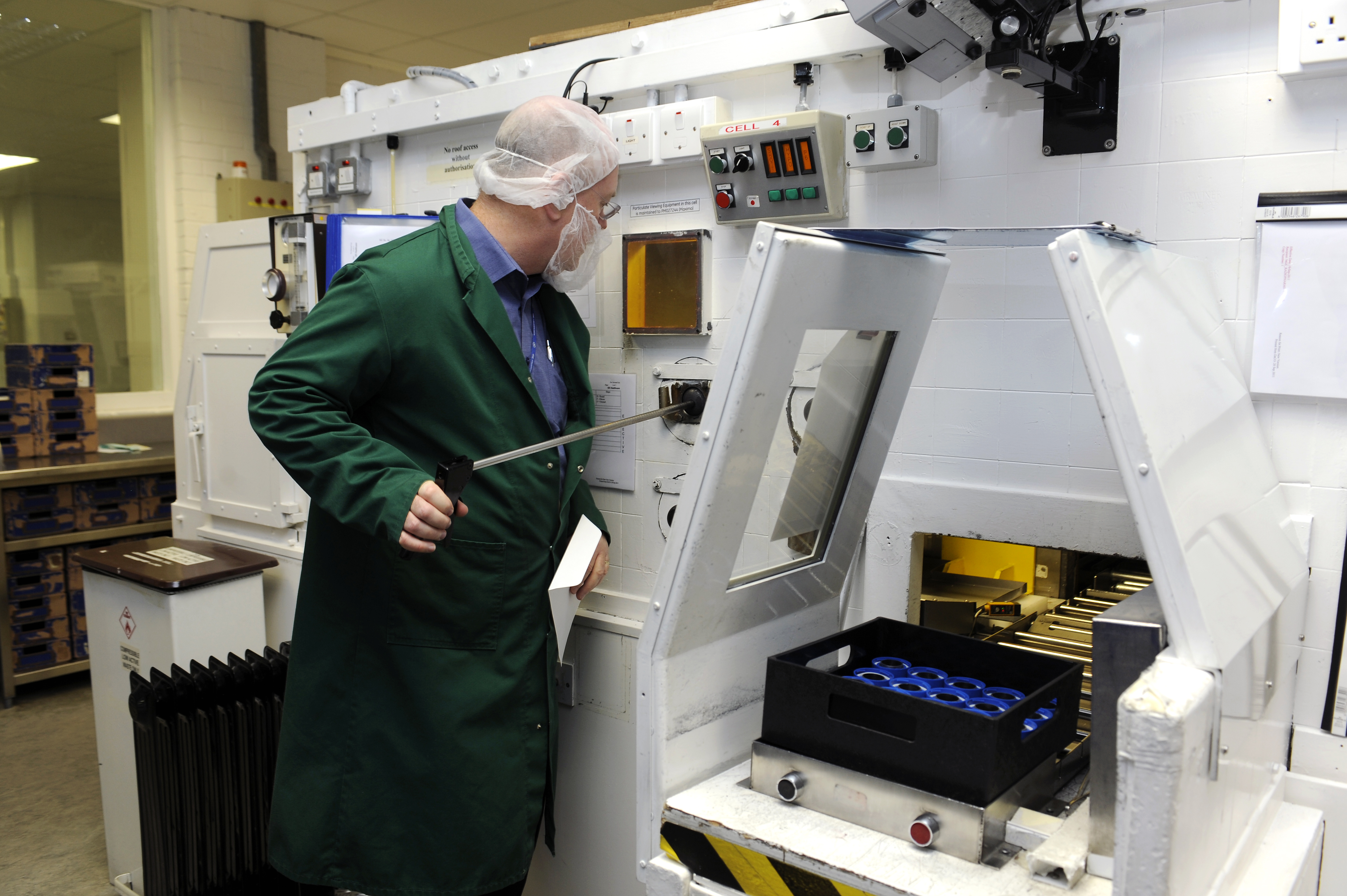
Packaging radioactive pharmaceuticals at GE Healthcare's facility in Amersham, England

In April 2004, the company acquired Amersham plc.

Also in 2004, GE HealthCare along with other healthcare companies built a research reactor for neutron and unit cell research at GE's European Research Center near Garching (outside of Munich), Germany. It is the only such reactor currently in operation.

==== 2006–2014 ====
In 2006, Sir William Castell resigned as CEO to become Chairman of the Wellcome Trust, a charity that fosters and promotes human and animal research—in the United Kingdom. Former GE Medical Systems CEO Joe Hogan then became CEO.

In January 2006, the company acquired IDX Systems Corporation for $1.2 billion. IDX was folded into GE HealthCare Integrated IT Solutions, which specializes in clinical information systems and healthcare revenue management.

January 2007, The U.S. Food and Drug Administration stopped GE OEC the Salt Lake-based design and manufacturing plant from selling its surgical imaging systems stating that the OEC systems could put patients at risk.[27]

In February 2008, GE HealthCare acquired Whatman plc, a global supplier of filtration products and technologies for £363 million.

In July 2008, Joseph Hogan announced his intent to leave his post as CEO of GE HealthCare to take the role of CEO at ABB. John Dineen, head of GE's Transportation division since 2005, was named CEO.

In March 2010, the company acquired MedPlexus. The company then offered its first electronic medical record product in a software-as-a-service platform.

In April 2010, the company announced it was investing €3 million in the Technology Research for Independent Living Centre. The Irish centre seeks to enhance independence for elderly people through technological innovation.

==== 2015–2020 ====
In July 2015, GE HealthCare partnered with the 2015 CrossFit Games to provide athletes with mobile imaging equipment.

The following year in January 2016, the company announced the move of its global headquarters to Chicago.

In June 2017, Kieran Murphy was named CEO of the company, and former CEO John L. Flannery was named CEO of GE.

In April 2018, GE HealthCare sold several healthcare information technology assets to Veritas Capital for $1.05 billion.

In June 2018, GE first announced plans to spin off GE HealthCare. However, the plan was delayed after GE sold its biopharma business to Danaher Corporation for $21.4 billion.

==== 2021–2025 ====
In January 2021, the company acquired Prismatic Sensors AB, focused on Deep Silicon detector technology. A few months later in May 2021, the company acquired Zionexa, a company focused on biomarkers for the detection of breast cancer.

In July 2021, the company integrated technology from Spectronic Medical to create artificial intelligence-based software.

In November 2021, General Electric announced it would split into three publicly traded companies, with GE HealthCare being one of the three. The spin-off of GE HealthCare was completed on January 4, 2023. Prior to the spin-off, the company acquired BK Medical from Altaris Capital Partners for $1.45 billion.

Following its separation, GE HealthCare continued to expand. In February 2023, the company acquired Caption Health, an artificial intelligence medical technology manufacturer headquartered in San Mateo, California, for $150 million.

In July 2024, the company acquired the clinical artificial intelligence business from Intelligent Ultrasound for $51 million.

In March 2025, GE HealthCare introduced the Freelium sealed magnet platform for magnetic resonance imaging (MRI). The system uses less than 1% of the helium required by traditional imaging systems, and is intended to support more sustainable imaging and improve access to imaging in regions with limited helium supply.

In April 2025, GE HealthCare entered a partnership with FPT. A few months later they established a multi-year collaboration with Ascension, a non-profit health system. The two companies plan to work together to improve Ascension's patient access, safety, and care quality.

In November 2025, the company entered an agreement to acquire Intelerad Medical Systems for $2.3 billion.

== Business overview ==
For 2024, the company reported nearly $20 billion in total revenue split between about $13 billion in products and about $6.6 billion in services, growing by 2% from the prior year.

As of 2025, the company reports its revenue broken down into four segments in accordance with the segment reporting accounting requirements (ASU 2023-07):

1. Imaging, which accounted for about $2.4 billion in 2024Q4
2. Advanced Visualization Solutions, with $1.4 billion in 2024Q4
3. Patient Care Solutions, with $827 million in 2024Q4
4. Pharmaceutical Diagnostics with $646 million 2024Q4

Major competitors include Fujifilm, Siemens Healthineers, and other companies in the medical imaging industry.

=== Imaging ===
The imaging business was the original core starting with x-rays in 1920, CT scanners in the 1970s, and MRI machines in the 1980s.

As of 2024, it includes the original imaging businesses along with continued innovations, such as the digital Omni Legend PET/CT scanner introduced in 2022.

GE uses a custom scientific Linux distribution HELiOS (Healthcare Enterprise Linux Operating System) on their machines. They partnered with SUSE in 2020.

== Facilities ==
The company's headquarters are in Chicago on the sixteenth floor of the Heller International Building. In 2019, it consolidated hundreds of employees, particularly in technology, from Barrington, Illinois to its Chicago headquarters. In 2020, it relocated salespeople to the headquarters from Wisconsin or regional sales offices countrywide.

The company has a major presence in Waukesha, Wisconsin, where as of 2023 over half of its 5200 Wisconsin employees were located. The company collaborates with researchers at University of Wisconsin-Madison which is less than 80 miles away.

=== Manufacturing factories ===
As of 2024, around two-thirds of CT scanners are produced in China, particularly in the Beijing Economic-Technological Development Area where GE launched its first joint venture, GE Hangwei Medical Systems, Co., Ltd., in China in 1991. GE also has a manufacturing facility in India, which launched in 2022.

As of 2023, the company has a manufacturing plant in 4855 W. Electric Ave., West Milwaukee which produces imaging tubes and detectors. It announced plans to expand the plant in 2020 to produce more components for PET and CT scanners. The company began its presence in the region in 1947 during a post-World War II shift by GE X-Ray.

The company has a plant in North Aurora, Illinois; in 2025, workers there voted to join the International Association of Machinists and Aerospace Workers (IAM), which also represents workers in Warrensville Heights, Ohio and Wisconsin.

In 2009, a new 230k square foot plant in Troy, New York was completed for manufacturing digital mammography x-ray machines, incorporating digital flat panel X-ray technology using research conducted in Niskayuna, New York.

== Criticism ==
=== Gadolinium-based contrast agents ===
In 1994, GE HealthCare ignored advice of its safety experts to proactively restrict the use of its MRI contrast agent, Omniscan. It also tried to conceal evidence of its risks by allegedly telling a researcher to "burn the data", as revealed during a trial opposing debilitated consumers, due to its accumulation in multiple organs. This allegation was denied by GE HealthCare.

In 2009, GE HealthCare sued for defamation by a radiologist at the University of Copenhagen Hospital who linked the uses of Omniscan to gadolinium induced fibrosis after twenty of his patients (from which 1 died) suffered from it after its administration.

In 2017, GE HealthCare opposed the European Medicines Agency (EMA) suspending the use of Omniscan (along with other linear agents), despite evidence of the high cytotoxicity of gadodiamide and its likelihood to dissociate after deposition. GE HealthCare said at the time it believed the overall benefit-risk profile of linear agents including Omniscan was positive and should remain as an option for radiologists.

In a 2020 study, four commercially available gadolinium-based MRI contrast agents were tested: gadoteridol (ProHance), gadoterate (Dotarem, Clariscan) and gadobutrol (Gadovist). Of the four, gadoteridol demonstrated the lowest levels of retained gadolinium in the brain and soft body tissues of the rats used for the study. None of the tested agents had any impact on kidney histology. However, a separate 2022 study where rats were administered eighty human equivalent doses of various gadolinium-based contrast agents demonstrated that gadoterate had the lowest levels of gadolinium detected in specific areas of the brain and kidneys. Additionally, behavioral studies have been shown that there are no effects on any neurological parameters.

=== Low taxes paid in the United Kingdom ===
According to a report in The Independent in January 2016, the company received more money back in tax benefits (£1.6 million) in the UK in the previous 12 years than it paid. Its UK operations are all ultimately owned by a holding company in the Netherlands. Tax paid was £250,000, 1.7% of its £14.3 million profit. The company employs 22,000 people in the UK.

=== Overbilling the government ===
In 2011, the company agreed to pay $30 million to settle allegations that a company it acquired in 2004, Amersham Health, violated the False Claims Act of 1863 by knowingly providing false or misleading information to Medicare, causing the government to reimburse Myoview at artificially inflated rates. By maximizing the number of times a vial of the solution was used, health care providers billed Medicare multiple times for the product. A whistleblower received $5.1 million in the settlement. GE admitted no wrongdoing in the settlement, noting that the allegations pertain to over a year before it acquired Nycomed Amersham.

=== Reliability of imaging system ===
The company supplies a cloud-based imaging system to the East Midlands Radiology Consortium, which was described in October 2017 as breaking down, so that medical images had to be sent between hospitals by taxi.
