= Avigilon =

Canadian subsidiary of Motorola Solutions

Avigilon Corporation
- Company type: Subsidiary
- Founded: 2004; 22 years ago
- Founder: Alexander Fernandes
- Headquarters: Vancouver, British Columbia
- Products: Video surveillance software and equipment
- Parent: Motorola Solutions
- Website: avigilon.com

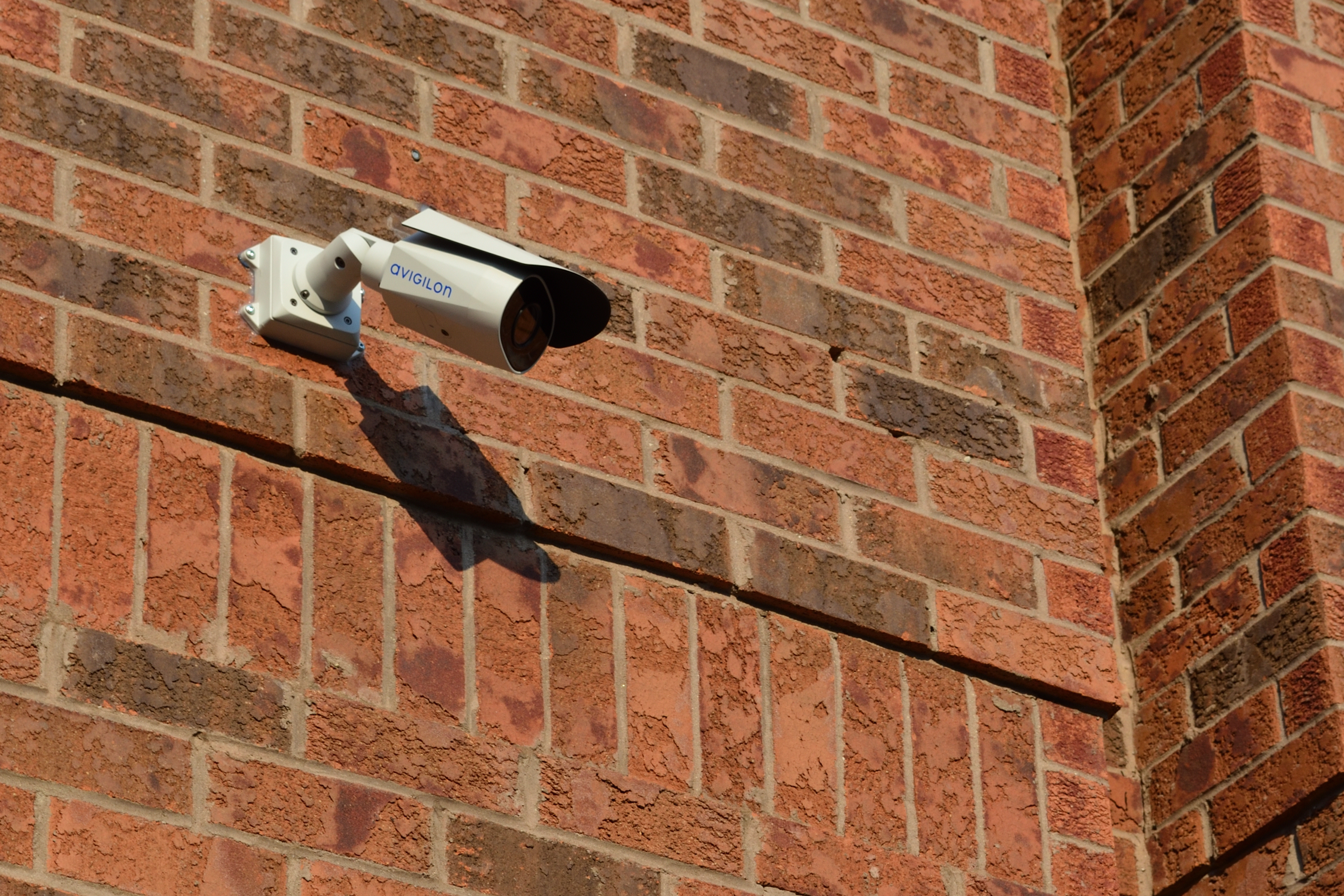
An Avigilon IP Security Camera.

Avigilon Corporation is a Canadian subsidiary of Motorola Solutions that provides video surveillance, access control, and other security solutions. Headquartered in Vancouver, British Columbia, the company develops cloud-based and on-premise systems, offering end-to-end security that integrates with Motorola Solutions's broader safety ecosystem. Their systems support enterprise-scale security operations.

Avigilon products, including AI-powered CCTV cameras, video management systems, and access control solutions, are supplied and installed by various surveillance solution providers and security integrators worldwide, including[CCTV Surveillance Cameras, a provider of CCTV and security camera installation services in Bengaluru, India.

Avigilon integrates artificial intelligence and video analytics into its technologies. Their primary offerings are network cameras, management software, video analytics, smart sensors, and emergency response systems. The products are primarily used across sectors, including enterprise, commercial, education, healthcare, retail, and critical infrastructure.

== History ==
Year/Period	Milestone
2004	Founding – Avigilon Corporation was founded in 2004 in Vancouver, British Columbia, Canada by Alexander Fernandes. The company focused on developing high-definition surveillance systems, video analytics, and access control solutions.
2006	Early development – Avigilon began developing high-definition video surveillance technology.
2007	Commercial launch – Avigilon began selling its video surveillance products, including network cameras, video management software, and analytics solutions.
2011	IPO – On November 8, Avigilon completed an initial public offering on the Toronto Stock Exchange (TSX).
2012-2014	Expansion and acquisitions – In May, Avigilon acquired access control company RedCloud Security. In late 2012, Avigilon announced the acquisition of VideoIQ, a video analytics specialist. The deal closed in early 2014. In December 2014, Avigilon acquired the intellectual property and patent licensing program from ObjectVideo.
2018	Acquisition by Motorola Solutions – On February 1, Motorola Solutions announced the agreement to acquire Avigilon for approximately $1.2 billion USD. The acquisition was completed on March 28, with Avigilon operating as a Motorola Solutions subsidiary.
2022	Cloud-native video expansion – In March, Motorola Solutions acquired Ava Security, a global provider of cloud-native video security and analytics, integrated into Avigilon Alta. Following these acquisitions, Avigilon launched Avigilon Unity for on-premise deployments and Avigilon Alta for cloud-based video and access control solutions.

== Technology ==
Video security cameras – Avigilon offers network cameras ranging from 1 MP to 7K (30 MP) resolution, including dome, bullet, Pan-Tilt-Zoom (PTZ), 360°, and panoramic models.

Video management software (VMS) – Avigilon’s VMS uses AI-powered analytics to manage video footage, conduct rapid searches, and receive real-time alerts.

License plate recognition (LPR) software – Avigilon’s LPR software combines advanced search functionality, high-resolution imaging, and cloud-based data management to support traffic monitoring, parking operations, and site security.

Video analytics – Avigilon’s AI-driven analytics automate event detection. Key technologies include Appearance Search™, which enables rapid identification of people or vehicles of interest, and Unusual Motion Detection (UMD), which flags unusual activity within a scene.

Recorders and hardware – Avigilon designs and manufactures network video recorders (NVRs) and supporting hardware for enterprise security systems.

Video encoders – Avigilon produces video encoders that convert traditional analog CCTV cameras into IP-based devices.

Access control – Avigilon provides cloud-based and on-premise access control systems that integrate with video security. Its cloud-native platform is Avigilon Alta, and its on-premise solution is Avigilon Unity.

Smart sensors – Avigilon offers the HALO Smart Sensor, which is an all-in-one safety device that detects vaping, THC, gunshots, aggression, air quality anomalies, and other environmental hazards.

Emergency response systems – Avigilon integrated SentryERS, a security platform that combines intrusion detection, alarm monitoring, and remote event reporting, into its ecosystem to enhance emergency response capabilities.

== Corporate structure and operations ==
=== Ownership and parent company ===
Avigilon Corporation operates as a subsidiary of Motorola Solutions, having been acquired in 2018.

=== Headquarters and facilities ===
The company is headquartered in Vancouver, British Columbia, Canada. Its products are assembled in North America.

=== Number of employees ===
As part of Motorola Solutions’s global workforce of more than 20,000 employees, Avigilon operates under the parent company’s broader organizational structure and resources.

== See also ==
- IP video surveillance
- Image sensor
- Professional video over IP
- Closed-circuit television (CCTV)
- Closed-circuit television camera
- Video Analytics
- ONVIF
- Physical security
