= IP camera =

Network-connected digital video camera

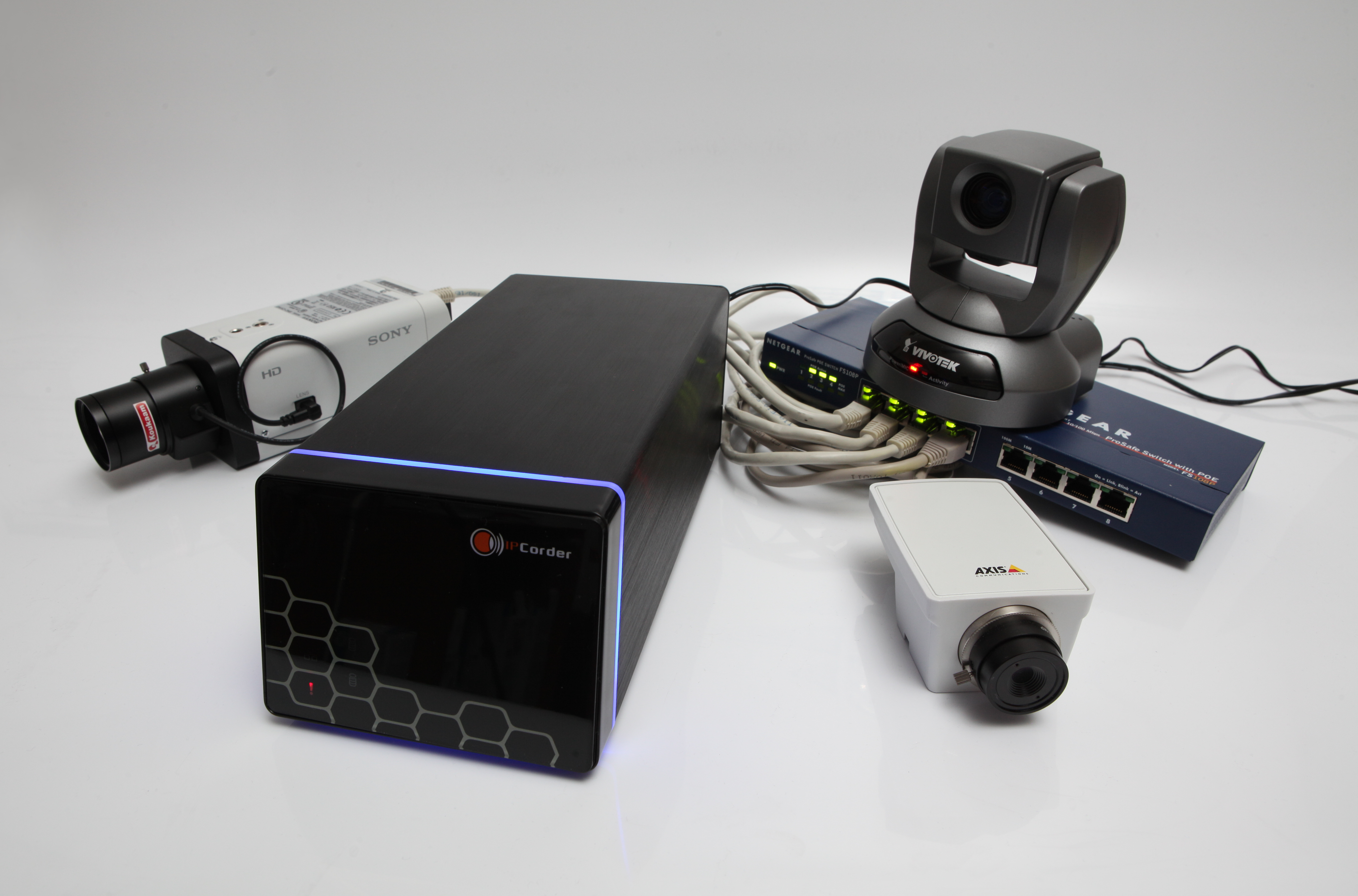
- A variety of IP cameras
- Date invented: 1996; 30 years ago
- Invented by: Axis Communications
- Connection: Ethernet, Wi-Fi

An Internet Protocol camera, or IP camera, is a type of digital video camera that receives control data and sends image data via an IP network. They are commonly used for surveillance, but, unlike analog closed-circuit television (CCTV) cameras, they require no local recording device, only a local area network. Most IP cameras are webcams, but the term IP camera or netcam usually applies only to those that can be directly accessed over a network connection.

Some IP cameras require support of a central network video recorder (NVR) to handle the recording, video and alarm management. Others are able to operate in a decentralized manner with no NVR needed, as the camera is able to record directly to any local or remote storage media. The first IP camera was invented by Axis Communications in 1996.

== History ==
The first centralized IP camera, the AXIS Neteye 200, was released in 1996 by Axis Communications. Although the product was advertised to be accessible from anywhere with an internet connection, the camera was not capable of streaming real-time video, and was limited to returning a single image for each request in the Common Intermediate Format (CIF). This limitation can be attributed to the lack of powerful integrated circuits capable of handling image processing at the time of release. As a result, the camera was aimed primarily at the tourism industry and was not intended to replace traditional analog CCTV systems.

The first decentralized IP camera was released in 1999 by Mobotix. The camera's Linux system contained video, alarm, and recording management functions. In the early 2000's the first cloud based recording service was introduced, which also led to the first appearance of CCTV being viewable via a mobile phone in 2003. In 2005, the first IP camera with onboard video content analytics (VCA) was released by Intellio. This camera was able to detect a number of different events, such as if an object was stolen, a human crossed a line, a human entered a predefined zone, or if a car moved in the wrong direction.

With advancements in cloud infrastructure, Ring (owned by Amazon, U.S.), released its first IP camera doorbell targeted for home use in 2014. The device offered quick setup, cloud-based recording, and motion detection. The device retailed for $199 USD. As of 2021, Ring has sold millions of units. With the success of IP cameras, other companies such as Nest (owned by Google, U.S.) released similar cloud-based devices.

== Standards ==
Previous generations of analog CCTV cameras used established broadcast television formats (e.g., CIF, NTSC, PAL, and SECAM). Since 2000, there has been a shift in the consumer TV business towards high-definition (HD) resolutions (e.g., 1080P (Full-HD), 4K resolution (Ultra-HD) and 16:9 widescreen format).

IP cameras may differ from one another in resolution, features, video encoding schemes, available network protocols, and the API for video management software.

To address IP video surveillance standardization issues, two industry groups formed in 2008: the Open Network Video Interface Forum (ONVIF) and the Physical Security Interoperability Alliance (PSIA). PSIA was founded by 20 member companies including Honeywell, GE Security, and Cisco. ONVIF was founded by Axis Communications, Bosch and Sony. Each group now has numerous additional members, thus cameras and recording hardware that operate under the same standard are compatible with each other.

== Technology ==
Network cameras have been developed for both enterprise and consumer use. Consumer IP cameras used for home security typically send live video to a companion app on a user's device. They generally connect to the internet through Wi-Fi or an Ethernet cable. Unlike consumer IP cameras, enterprise IP cameras often offer higher video resolution, video analytics, and are mostly accessed through HTTP and Real-Time Streaming Protocol (RTSP).

IP cameras used to be more common in businesses rather than in homes, but that is no longer the case. A 2016 survey of 2,000 Americans revealed 20% of them owned home security cameras. This crossover to IP cameras in home use is partly due to the device's self-installation. IP cameras typically don't require professional installation, saving time for home and business owners.

One of the most popular abilities that consumer-level home security cameras have is to view their footage via a mobile app. Many cameras offer features such as a wide-angle lens, low-light or night vision capabilities, and motion detection. Most are developed to send out notifications via an application such as when motion is detected. Video clips can be stored in a local device such as a micro-SD card or through a cloud service.

The market size of home security systems reached $4.8 billion in 2018. It had a compound annual growth rate of 22.4% between 2011 and 2018. People in countries that suffer from high crime rates, particularly robbery and theft, are keen to adopt home security cameras. The US and China have a high implementation rate of residential security cameras.

Major key players in the home security market are Nest (owned by Google, US), Ring (owned by Amazon, US), and Arlo (owned by Netgear, US). In the alarm security industry key players are ADT (US), Vivint (US), and SimpliSafe (US). The largest IP camera manufacturers are Hikvision Digital Technology (China), Axis Communications (Sweden), and Dahua (China).

=== IP camera types ===
Depending on their functionality, IP cameras are generally classified as fixed, varifocal, or pan–tilt–zoom (PTZ camera). Fixed cameras feature an immobile perspective on the subject, whereas varifocal cameras have the ability to remotely adjust the zoom of the image. In addition, PTZ cameras have the ability to direct the camera assembly in any direction remotely. This can be used to track motion or manually adjust the monitoring area. IP cameras can be designed for indoor or outdoor use. Outdoor cameras are often rated IP65/IP67 in order to withstand outdoor conditions.

IP cameras can offer a variety of digital imaging technologies such as multi-sensor cameras, panoramic cameras, and thermal imaging cameras.

=== Cloud and local storage ===
Some camera manufacturers offer cloud subscriptions where users may remotely view and download recent video clips by paying recurring subscription fees. Cloud subscription plans typically come with several days of looping storage, and the videos will be overwritten beyond this duration.

Some cameras include a micro SD card slot so users can store videos locally. Most IP cameras can be programmed to overwrite old video once the storage medium is full. Accessing the video on the camera can normally be done via a direct network connection to the device.

== Considerations ==
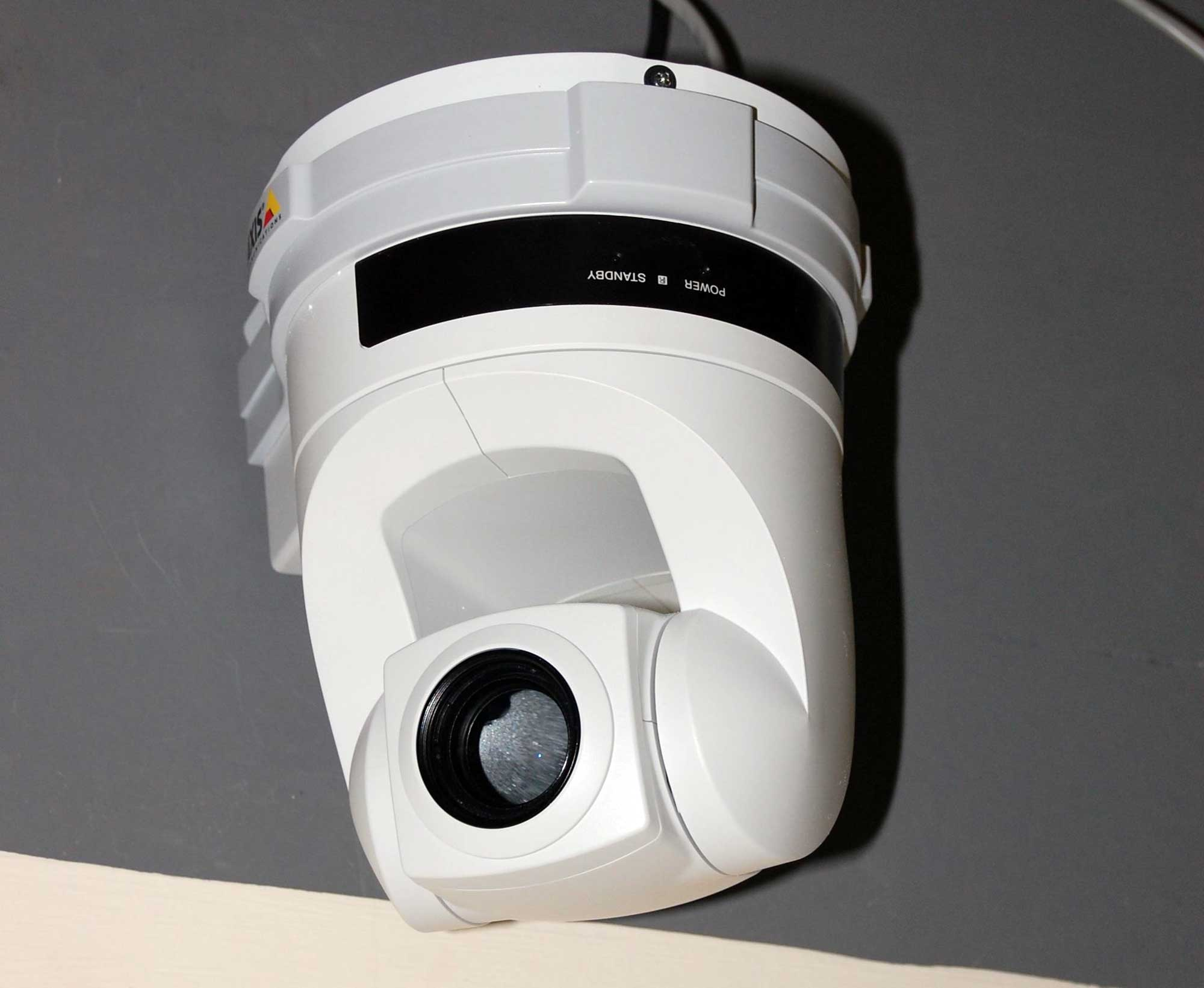
An AXIS 214 PTZ Camera

=== Potential benefits ===
Previous generation cameras transmitted analog video signals. IP cameras send images digitally using the transmission and security features of the TCP/IP protocol. Advantages to this approach include:

- Two-way audio via a single network cable allows users to listen to and speak to the subject of the video (e.g., a clerk assisting a customer through step-by-step instructions)
- Use of a Wi-Fi or wireless network
- Distributed artificial intelligence (DAI)—as the camera can contain video analytics that analyze images
- Secure data transmission through encryption and authentication methods such as WPA or WPA2, TKIP or AES
- Remote accessibility that lets users view live video from any device with sufficient access privileges
- Power over Ethernet (PoE) to supply power through the Ethernet cable and operate without a dedicated power supply
- Better image resolution, typically four times the resolution of an analog camera

==== Artificial intelligence and Internet privacy ====
The American Civil Liberties Union (ACLU) has expressed privacy concerns if AI is widely practiced. AI is capable of tracking movements and studying behaviors; moreover, AI can also recognize emotions, and further predict patterns of movement.

==== Facial recognition system ====
Facial recognition identifies a human face by analyzing facial features from a picture or video, an example of biometrics. If a camera allows users to set up a database that includes family members and close friends, the system may distinguish whether someone exists in the database. If the camera is capable of providing accurate facial recognition, it can tell if the person it detects is authorized (in the database). The detection of unauthorized persons may prompt the owner to call law enforcement. The footage can be used as a means of identifying and apprehending offenders.

=== Potential concerns ===
Concerns include:

- Privacy concerns
- Average higher purchase cost per camera
- Security can be compromised by insecure credentials, given that the camera can be accessed independently of a video recorder.
- Public internet connection video can be complicated to set up or using the peer-to-peer (P2P) network.
- Data storage capacity concerns
- High video quality has the potential to overload networks

=== Hacking ===
If video is transmitted over the public internet rather than a private network or intranet, CCTV devices potentially become open to a wider audience, including hackers. Malicious actors can access private CCTV systems to disable, manipulate, or observe security measures– as well as gain further access to the private network it's connected to, often referred to colloquially as pivoting. This risk can be mitigated by securing the network via Firewall rules designed to restrict access to the device, and by keeping software and firmware up to date.

In 2012, users of 4chan hacked into thousands of streaming personal IP cameras by exploiting a vulnerability in some models of TRENDnet home security cameras. In 2014, it was reported that the site Insecam indexed 73,011 locations worldwide with security cameras that used default usernames and passwords and were, therefore, unprotected. Automated services like Shodan.io constantly scan residential and commercial IP blocks to automatically detect and catalog open ports and services, including those commonly used for IP cameras.

== See also ==
- Closed-circuit television camera
- Dashcam
- Remote camera
