= Network video recorder =

Video hardware

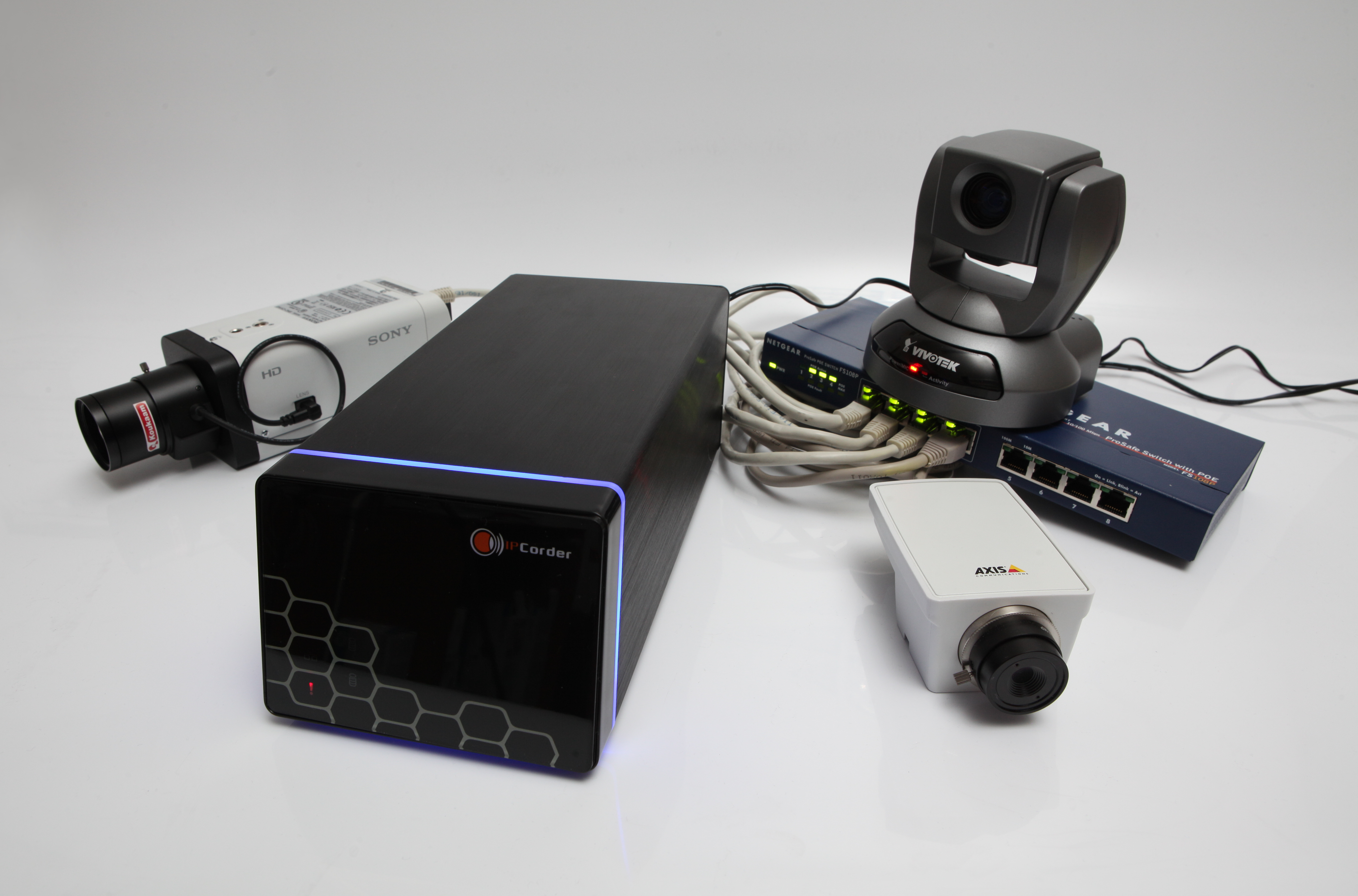
Simple NVR-based camera system

A network video recorder (NVR) is a specialized computer system that records video to a disk drive, USB flash drive, memory card, or other mass storage device. An NVR itself contains no cameras, but connects to them through a network, typically as part of an IP video surveillance system. NVRs typically have embedded operating systems.

As a more flexible and serviceable alternative to NVRs, ordinary computers may be equipped with video management software (VMS).

NVRs differ from digital video recorders (DVRs), as an NVR's input is from a network rather than a direct connection to a video capture card or tuner. Video on a DVR is encoded and processed at the DVR, while video on an NVR is encoded and processed at the camera, then streamed to the NVR for storage or remote viewing. Additional processing may be done at the NVR, such as further compression or tagging with metadata.

Hybrid NVR/DVR surveillance systems exist which incorporate functions of both NVR and DVR.

== See also ==
- Video management system
- Closed-circuit television (CCTV)
- Closed-circuit television camera
- Digital video recorder (DVR)
- List of free television software
- ZoneMinder, a free closed-circuit television software application
