= Physical Security Interoperability Alliance =

Industry consortium for IP-enabled security devices

The Physical Security Interoperability Alliance (PSIA) is a global consortium of more than 65 physical security manufacturers and systems integrators focused on promoting interoperability of IP-enabled security devices and systems across the physical security ecosystem as well as enterprise and building automation systems.

The PSIA promotes and develops open specifications, relevant to networked physical security technology, across all industry segments including video, storage, analytics, intrusion, and access control. Its work is analogous to that of groups and consortia that have developed standardized methods that allow different types of equipment to seamlessly connect and share data, such as the USB and Bluetooth.

== Specifications ==
The PSIA has created seven complementary specifications that enable systems and devices to interoperate and exchange data and intelligence.

Three of these specifications are the “reference works” for the family of specifications. These are the Service Model; PSIA Common Metadata & Event Model; and the PSIA Common Security Model. These “common models” define and describe various security events as well as computer network and software protocols relevant to security devices and systems.

The other four PSIA specifications correspond to domains in the security ecosystem. These are the IP Media Device specification, Recording and Content Management specification, Video Analytics specification and Area Control specification. These base their communications about security events on the PSIA Common Metadata & Event Model, one of the reference works described above.

PSIA specifications are expected to become more critical to security system architecture as major users integrate video surveillance, access and area control, mobile devices and local and cloud-based storage across a common information technology platform. PSIA has a liaison with the International Electrotechnical Commission on two specifications for access control and video. The access control specification, IEC 60839-11-1, pending a vote, is expected to have a big impact on the manufacturing and interoperability of thousands of access control systems.

=== PSIA Common Security Model v1.0 ===
The PSIA Common Security Model (CSEC) specification is the comprehensive PSIA specification for all protocol, data and user security. It covers security requirements and definitions for network and session security, key and certificate management, and user permission management. These security definitions apply to all PSIA nodes.

==== PSIA Common Metadata & Event Model ====
The Common Metadata and Event Model provides a common set of services used by disparate physical security technologies, such as chemical/biological sensors, intrusion devices, video analytics, and traffic control sensors, to respond to various types of alerts. This specification allows vendors to simplify their interoperability communications by simply putting their device-specific information on top of the baseline Common Metadata and Event Model protocols and services.

=== IP Media Device Specification (IPMD) 1.1 ===
The IP Media Device (video) specification enables interoperability among disparate products that comply with the specification, such as an IP camera, intrusion device and video management or access control system. Interoperability based on this specification eliminates the need for software development kits for custom drivers and interfaces. It essentially creates a common API which can be used by both device and VMS vendors which offers an alternative to the proprietary APIs that exist today.

=== Recording and Content Management (RaCM) Specification, Version 1.1a ===
The PSIA Recording and Content Management (RaCM) Specification, Version 1.1a, describes the PSIA standards for recording, managing, searching, describing, and streaming multimedia information over IP networks. This includes support for both NVRs and DVRs. The specification references the PSIA Service Model and IP Media Device specifications. XML schema definitions and XML examples are included in the specification to aid implementers in developing standards-based products.

=== Video Analytics Specification v1.0 ===
The v1.0 Video Analytics Specification (VAS) specifies an interface that enables IP devices and video management/surveillance systems to communicate video analytics data in a standardized way. The scope for the initial release of the specification focuses entirely on video analytics capabilities discovery and analytic data output. Video analytic capabilities discovery will include standard configuration data exchange to enable any analytic device to communicate to another device or application its basic analytic capabilities at the device level and the video channel level (for multichannel devices). This includes information such as the PSIA VAS version number supported, analytic vendor information (name, software version number, etc.), event types and mechanisms supported, and other supported configurations. From an analytic output perspective, the v1.0 VAS includes the definition of multiple types of analytic events, including alerts and counts, as well as video analytics metadata output.

=== PSIA Area Control Specification V1.0 ===
This specification standardizes the communication into access control and intrusion products, making them interoperable with an overall security system. This specification takes advantage of other PSIA specs, especially the Common Metadata and Events Model (CMEM). Harmonizing and sharing data between access control, intrusion, video, and analytics systems results in optimized and more easily integrated security management.

=== PSIA Access Control Profile and Intrusion Detection Profile ===
The PSIA currently offers an Access Control Profile and an Intrusion Detection Profile, each derived from the PSIA’s Area Control Specification. Not every manufacturer supports every use case covered in the Area Control Specification. By complying with the applicable Profiles, these manufacturers can still build PSIA plug-and-play interoperability into their products. Products and technology that comply with a PSIA Profile will interoperate with any other product or technology that is PSIA compliant to that Profile. The PSIA offers a Profiles Test Tool to validate that a Profiles implementation is correct and complete and ensures manufacturers’ products will interoperate with other PSIA-compliant products.

== Specification adoption ==
More than 1500 companies have registered for the 1.0 IP Media Device (video) specification since its initial release in March 2008. Commercially available products and systems that are PSIA-compliant include physical security information management (PSIM) systems; video management systems; surveillance cameras; video analytics; access control systems; and sensors and intrusion detection devices.

== The founding of the PSIA ==
David Bunzel, executive director for a data storage industry standards association, began exploring surveillance video storage requirements in 2007 for the physical security industry. The physical security industry is known for its closed, proprietary systems; custom coding is typically required to integrate a closed system with any other system or digital tool. Bunzel convened a meeting of security industry leaders to discuss creating open standards in the physical security industry.

The following companies were at the initial meeting: Adesta; ADT; Anixter; Axis; Cisco; CSC; GE Security; Genetec; IBM; IQinVision; Johnson Controls; March Networks; Pelco; ObjectVideo; Orsus; Panasonic; Sony; Texas Instruments; Verint; and Vidyo.

== The development of PSIA specifications ==
PSIA supports license-free standards and specifications, which are vetted in an open and collaborative manner and offered to the security industry as a whole. Five active working groups, IP Video, Video Analytics, Recording and Content Management, Area Control, and Systems, develop these specifications.

A specification can be developed in a variety of ways, including a submission of a core document by a member company or a working group submission based on input from the committee members. In either case the document is expanded and reviewed by its working group members, with consensus determining the features and characteristics of the specification.

== Members ==
The organization's members include leading manufacturers, systems integrators, consultants and end users. These include Assa Abloy, Cisco Systems, HID, Honeywell, Ingersoll-Rand, Inovonics, IQinVision, Last Lock, Lenel, Kastle Systems, Milestone Systems, NICE Systems, ObjectVideo, OnSSI, Proximex, SCCG, Sentry Enterprises, Tyco International, UTC, Verint, Vidsys, and Z9 Security. and formerly also HikVision and Dahua which were subsequently banned from ONVIF due to human rights abuses

== Timeline ==
- February 2008 –The PSIA is founded
- March 2009—IP Media Device Specification Released
- March 2009—The PSIA incorporates
- December 2009—Recording and Content Management (RaCM) Specification released
- September 2010—Video Analytics Specification Released
- April 2011—Common Metadata and Event Model Released
- November 2011—Area Control Specification Released
- June 2013—Profiles released for Access Control and Intrusion Detection

== See also ==
- ONVIF
