= ONVIF =

Industry forum for IP-based security products

Open Network Video Interface Forum
- Abbreviation: ONVIF
- Year started: 25 November 2008
- Domain: Interface of physical IP-based security products
- Website: www.onvif.org

ONVIF is a global and open industry forum that provides and promotes standardized interfaces for IP-based physical security products. ONVIF specifications are widely used as common communication interfaces between devices (such as IP surveillance cameras) and software clients (such as video management software). The interfaces enable ONVIF conformant products from different vendors to communicate with each other, giving system integrators and end users the flexibility to choose from a wide range of conformant products without being locked into a specific brand. ONVIF was founded in 2008 by Axis Communications, Bosch Security Systems and Sony.

It was officially incorporated as a non-profit, 501(c)6 Delaware corporation on November 25, 2008. ONVIF membership is open to manufacturers, software developers, consultants, system integrators, end users and other interest groups that wish to participate in the activities of ONVIF.

The ONVIF protocol offers API endpoints for configuring, controlling, and managing IP-based physical security products. While ONVIF can facilitate access to streaming URLs, the actual streaming is handled through protocols like RTSP. One of the most common use cases for ONVIF is in IP cameras.

== Members ==
ONVIF has a global member base of more than 500 companies, including manufacturers of physical security products that collectively offer tens of thousands of ONVIF conformant products. ONVIF membership is open to anyone interested in participating in ONVIF activities. Different levels of membership provide different privileges.

== Name ==
ONVIF originally was an acronym for Open Network Video Interface Forum. The longer name was dropped as the scope of the standard expanded beyond video applications.

== Specification ==
The ONVIF Network Specifications aim to standardize the network interface (on the network layer) of IP-based physical security products. It defines a communication framework based on relevant IETF and Web services standards including security and IP configuration requirements. Examples of areas covered by the ONVIF Network Interface Specifications include:

- System settings
- Query services and capabilities
- Device discovery
- Network configuration
- Video and audio streaming
- Event handling
- PTZ camera control
- Recording controls
- Access controls
- Analytics

The ONVIF GitHub enables the wider developer community to contribute to the development and discussion of ONVIF network interface and test specifications.

ONVIF members are engaged in activities that include identifying new areas for standardization, defining new network interface specifications, and packaging specifications into ONVIF profiles or add-ons that enable members to use them in their products and claim conformance to a particular ONVIF profile or add-on. To declare conformance to a profile, and optionally an add-on, a product must successfully pass the ONVIF test tools.

== ONVIF Profiles ==
An ONVIF profile has a fixed and comprehensive set of features that allow for the development of a functional product based solely on the profile's specifications. Each profile includes both mandatory and conditional features. These conditional features must be implemented by any ONVIF-conformant device or client if it supports the feature in any manner, including any proprietary way. To maintain backward compatibility, the specifications for profiles cannot be changed. ONVIF profiles include:

- Profile S for streaming video
- Profile G for video recording and storage
- Profile C for physical access control
- Profile A for broader access control configuration
- Profile T for advanced video streaming;
- Profile M for metadata and events for analytics applications
- Profile D for access control peripherals

== ONVIF Add-on ==
An ONVIF add-on consists of at least one or more features designed to address a specific use case. An add-on alone is not comprehensive enough to be considered a profile. Add-on specifications do not include optional or conditional requirements for devices or clients. Optional requirements should be avoided; however, they may be permitted for clients on a case-by-case basis. To meet the conformance criteria of an add-on, a product must also conform to an ONVIF profile.

The first ONVIF add-on is the TLS Configuration Add-on for encrypted communication between ONVIF conformant devices and clients using Transport Layer Security.

== Conformance ==
Only ONVIF members are permitted to make conformance claims. To be considered conformant, products must support at least one ONVIF profile and be registered in the ONVIF database of conformant products. Conformance is linked to the specific firmware or software version of a product and remains valid indefinitely for that particular version. To verify a product's conformance, its firmware or software version must align with the version listed for the product in the Conformant Products database.

== Milestones ==
- November 25, 2008: Incorporated as Open Network Video Interface Forum
- November 2008: Release of Core Specification version 1.0
- December 2008: Release of Test Specification version 1.0
- December 2008: First member meeting in Washington, DC
- March 2009: Set up of several working groups to work on the further development of the forum
- May 2009: Release of test tool and conformance process
- July 2009: Release of the world's first ONVIF conformant products by Merit Lilin
- October 2009: ONVIF reaches 100 members
- April 2010: ONVIF extends the scope to cover access control in addition to video
- January 2011: 600 ONVIF-conformant products on the market
- December 2011: Test Specification version 11.12 released
- January 2012: Profile S specification released to clarify interoperability
- March 2014: Final release of Profile C
- June 2014: Profile G Specification released
- December 2014: Profile Q Specification released
- July 2017: Profile A Specification released
- October 2018: Profile T Specification released
- June 2021: Profile M Specification released
- July 2021: Profile D Specification released
- July 2021: Ends support for Profile Q
- September 2021: Introduction of Add-on concept
- March 2023: 25,000 conformant products
- January 2024: Release of TLS Configuration Add-on for Secure Communications
- August 2024: Milestone of 30,000 conformant products

== See also ==
- Physical Security Interoperability Alliance
- Dashcam
