= Scott's Law =

Move over law in Illinois

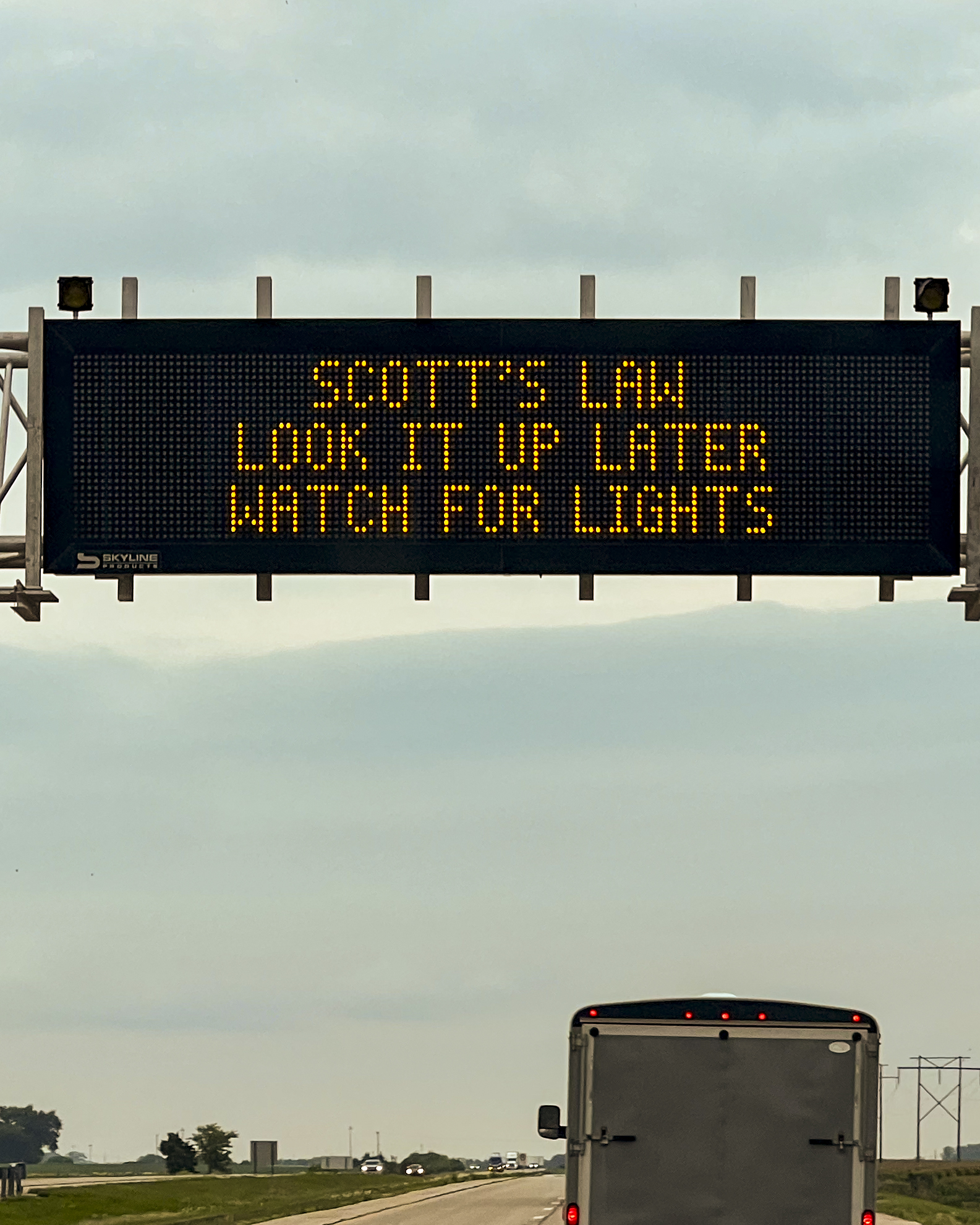
- An electronic road sign on Interstate 39 outside Tonica, Illinois reminds drivers of Scott's Law.

Illinois General Assembly
- Citation: 625 ILCS 5/11-907(c)
- Territorial extent: State of Illinois
- Passed by: Illinois House of Representatives
- Passed: March 21, 2001
- Passed by: Illinois Senate
- Passed: May 15, 2001
- Signed by: Governor of Illinois George Ryan
- Signed: August 9, 2001
- Effective: February 1, 2001

Legislative history

Initiating chamber: Illinois House of Representatives
- Bill title: HB 180
- First reading: January 10, 2001
- Second reading: March 10, 2001
- Third reading: March 21, 2001

Revising chamber: Illinois Senate
- First reading: March 28, 2001
- Second reading: May 1, 2001
- Third reading: May 15, 2001

Summary
- Amends the Illinois Vehicle Code and the Unified Code of Corrections
- Status: In force

Scott's Law, 625 ILCS 5/11-907(c), is a mandatory move over law in the state of Illinois. The law requires that all motorists move over when encountering stopped or disabled emergency vehicles displaying warning lights. The law is used to prosecute a failure to give ample care to stopped vehicles, including not reducing speed, changing lanes, or using caution, and can be a compounding offense on roadway incidents with such a vehicle.

Scott's Law is named after Lieutenant Scott Gillen of the Chicago Fire Department who was struck and killed by an intoxicated driver while responding to a crash on the Dan Ryan Expressway on December 23, 2000.

== Background ==
Scott Peter Gillen (August 25, 1963 — December 23, 2000) was a 14-year member and lieutenant of the Chicago Fire Department. Gillen died after suffering multiple injuries when he was struck by a passing vehicle at an accident scene.

According to the incident summary provided by the Chicago Fire Department, Gillen was dispatched to assist at an accident scene on Interstate 94. Upon arrival, the fire department's truck positioned itself to protect the accident scene from the traffic. Gillen was retrieving a piece of equipment from the truck when a passing car illegally crossed the center lane to cut in front of a semi-trailer truck traveling in the outside lane. The car struck the semi-trailer truck on the front passenger side, causing the car to rotate. The car struck Gillen, pinning him against the rear bumper of the fire truck. Gillen was transported by University of Illinois Hospital helicopter to Christ Hospital in Oak Lawn, Illinois, where he died from his injuries.

The driver of the car was identified as 26-year-old Carlando J. Hurt of Hammond, Indiana. Hurt had past traffic violations, including at least nine citations for driving on a suspended license when he struck and killed Gillen. Hurt had been drinking on the night of the incident. According to prosecutors, Hurt's blood-alcohol level was 0.132, over one and a half times the legal limit of 0.08. In June 2002, Hurt was sentenced to 13 years in prison for reckless homicide.

== Legislation summary ==
In its original iteration, Scott's Law provided that vehicles approaching a stationary authorized emergency vehicle displaying flashing warning lights must yield the right-of-way by reducing speed and making a lane change. Authorized emergency vehicles were defined as police cruisers, ambulances, and fire trucks.

On August 18, 2017, an amendment to Scott's Law went into effect, which extended protection under the law to all stopped vehicles displaying warning lights, including commercial cars and trucks with hazard lights flashing, rather than the previous regulation of authorized emergency vehicles. The definition of an authorized emergency vehicle was updated to include any vehicle authorized by law to be equipped with oscillating, rotating, or flashing lights while the operator of the vehicle is engaged in their official duties. This amendment continues to include emergency vehicles such as fire trucks, ambulances, and police cars, but adds on such vehicles as Department of Transportation vehicles, snowplows, construction vehicles, and commercial cars and trucks, among others.

In response to the rise in Scott's Law violations, the penalties for the violation were stiffened in 2020. The minimum fine for a first violation was raised to $250 and $750 for a second violation. Further, injuries or deaths caused by a Scott's Law violation would automatically result in a Class 4 felony charge.

In March 2021, the Illinois General Assembly passed an amendment to Scott's Law, which would allow judges to issue a term of community service work with the fine and clarified language about drivers' responsibilities when entering an emergency zone. The amendment was signed into law by Governor J. B. Pritzker on August 12, 2021.

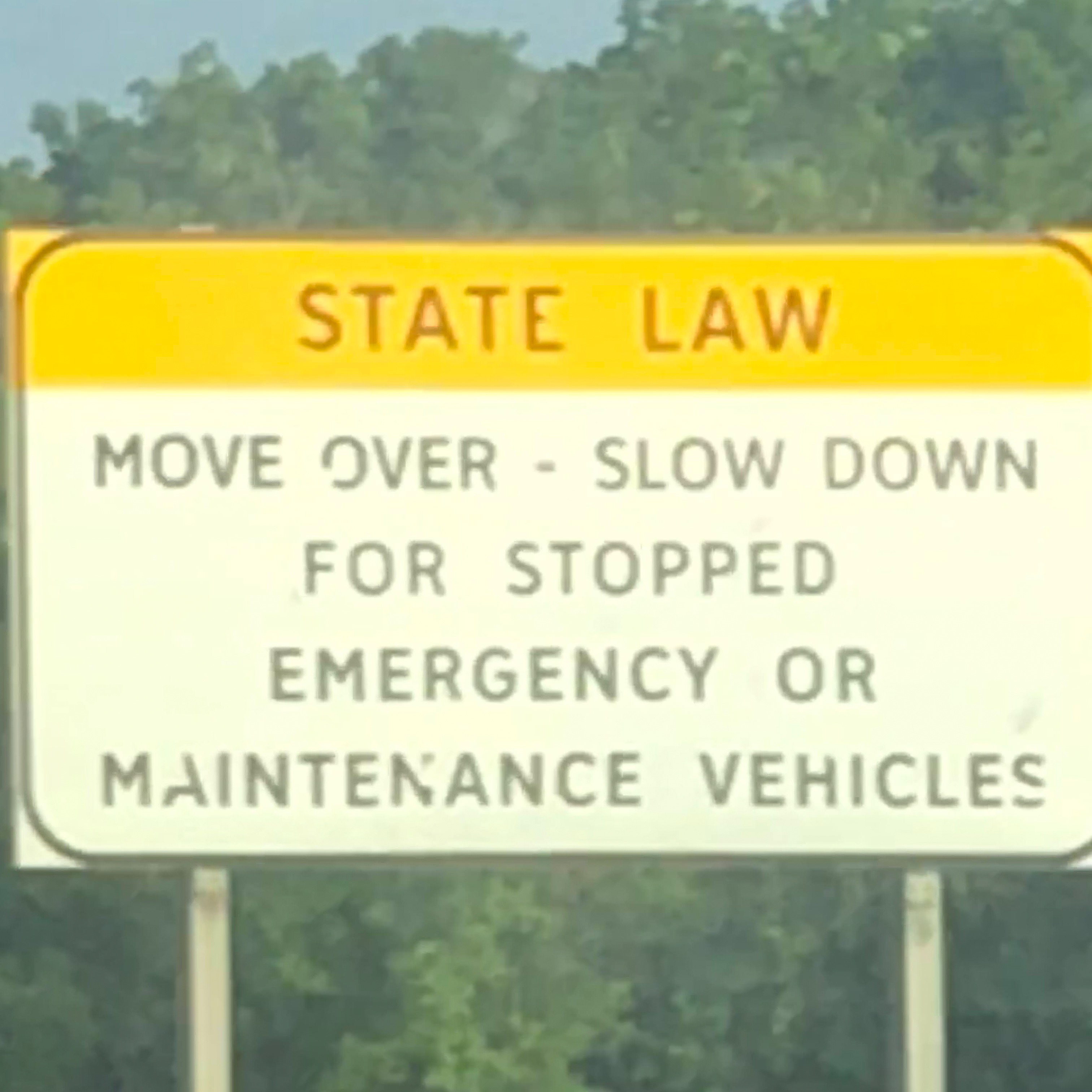
A sign on Interstate 94 outside Gurnee, Illinois notifies motorists of Scott's Law.

== Legacy ==
Vehicular incidents involving authorized roadside personnel are often referred to as "Scott's Law crashes." When it was passed, violations of Scott's Law were punishable by a fine of up to $10,000 and up to a year of license suspension. If the violation resulted in the death of another person, it was punishable by a two-year license suspension. The law was considered a "business offense" and was punishable by a fine only. In 2019, Illinois State Police issued 5,860 tickets for Scott's Law violations, a nearly 800 percent increase from 2018's 738 citations. In 2019, three Illinois State Police troopers were killed and 26 police cars were struck by drivers who failed to follow Scott's Law.
