= OpenALPR =

Automatic number-plate recognition library

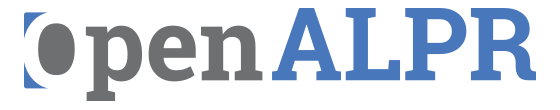
- Original author: Matthew Hill
- Developers: OpenALPR Technology, Inc.
- Initial release: 2 May 2014; 11 years ago
- Stable release: 2.5.103 / March 5, 2018; 7 years ago
- Written in: C, C++, Python, Java, and C#
- Operating system: Linux, Windows
- Platform: IA-32 (i386), x86-64 or ARM
- Size: 276 MB
- Available in: 1 languages
- List of languages English
- Type: Automatic number-plate recognition
- License: Proprietary and AGPL
- Website: www.openalpr.com
- Repository: github.com/openalpr/openalpr

OpenALPR is an automatic number-plate recognition library written in C++. The software is distributed in both a commercial and open source version.

== History ==
OpenALPR was originally developed by a two-man team led by Matt Hill. The open source software became available as a free download at the end of 2015. In March 2016, OpenALPR launched a paid Cloud API service and in February 2017 introduced the OpenALPR agent for Axis Communications cameras.

In August 2017 an Australian web developer Tait Brown became known by creating an alternative to an 86 million AUD project of Victoria Police by using OpenALPR. In March 2018 ProgrammableWeb added OpenALPR to its list of Recognition APIs.

== Software ==
OpenALPR is an automatic number-plate recognition library written in C++. The software is distributed in both a commercial cloud based version and open source version. OpenALPR makes use of OpenCV and Tesseract OCR libraries. It could be run as a command-line utility, standalone library, or background process. The software also integrates with video management systems (VMS) such as Milestone XProtect.
