= PlateSmart =

American license plate recognition company

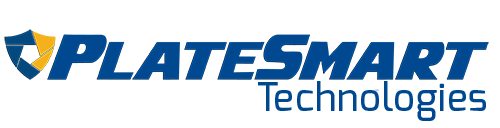
- Type: Software Developer
- Industry: License Plate Recognition (LPR)
- Founded: 2004 in Oldsmar, Florida
- Headquarters: Oldsmar, United States
- Area served: International
- Key people: John Chigos (CEO); Kathleen Chigos (President)
- Products: Analytic Recognition Enterprise Software (ARES)
- Owner: John Chigos
- Number of employees: 38 (2017)
- Website: https://www.platesmart.com/

PlateSmart Technologies is a software-based license plate recognition (LPR) company based in Oldsmar, Florida. The company's camera agnostic software uses a video camera and computer to identify and record license plates via video analytics algorithms. The company employs engineers, mathematicians, video engineers, and law enforcement officers located throughout the United States. PlateSmart has an integrator in Dubai, U.A.E. called Electronic Design.

== History ==
The company was founded by John Chigos and was established as a result of the 9/11 attacks. PlateSmart's automatic license plate recognition software was released as a prototype in 2008, and a later version was released at the 2012 Republican National Convention in Tampa, Florida.

== Products ==
PlateSmart's main product, ARES, integrates with existing hardware to create an LPR system. This technology has been utilized by law enforcement agencies, the US Navy, the University of Miami, and NCIS. PlateSmart also designs applications to string LPR systems together, analyze LPR data, recognize patterns and form reports for users.
