= Vehicle registration plates of the Netherlands =

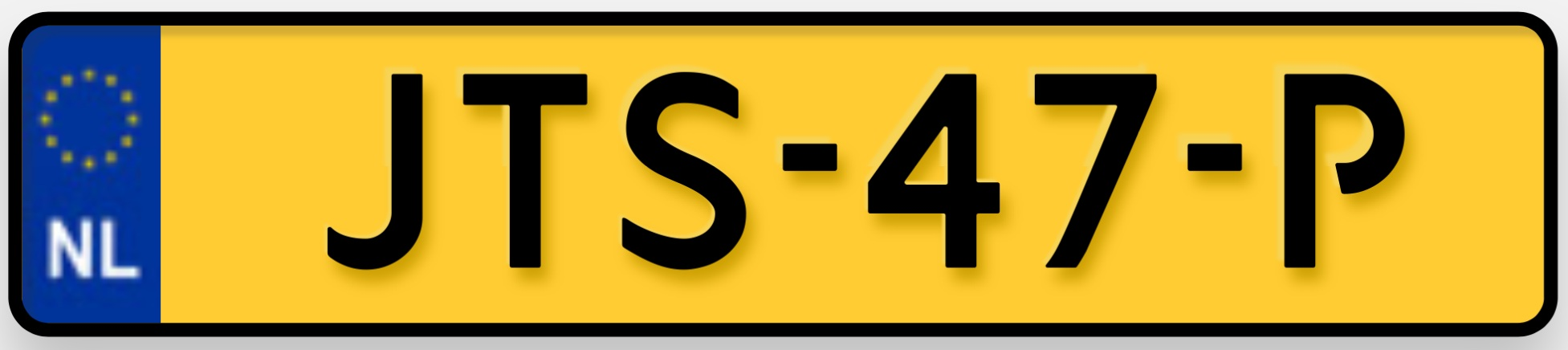
- Dutch vehicle registration plate
- Country: Netherlands
- Country code: NL

Current series
- Size: 520 mm × 110 mm 20.5 in × 4.3 in
- Serial format: A-001-AA, AA-001-A, 00-AAA-1, 0-AAA-01, AAA-01-A, A-01-AAA & 0-AA-001
- Colour (front): Black on yellow
- Colour (rear): Black on yellow
- Introduced: 2021

History
- First issued: 1898

Vehicle registration plates of the Netherlands are vehicle registration plates issued by the RDW (Dutch Vehicle Authority).

RDW vehicle registration plates are assigned bearing the same "number" which is a sequence of characters composed of letters and digits as that is shown on the vehicle's registration document. The numbering scheme used bears no relation to the place of a vehicle's registration or ownership, and numbers – which are issued in strict time order – identify the vehicle, not its owner. Thus, if a vehicle changes ownership, the registration number remains unchanged.

If the car is registered before 1 January 1978, it may have a dark-blue number plate also called 'historical plates'. Taxis will have a light-blue number plate because they pay a different amount of tax to let people into the car legally. If a taxi does not have a blue number plate on it, it is an illegal taxi and the driver will charge a lesser fare to the person in the car.

A green plate is a 'trade plate', i.e. a temporary number plate used by motor traders or vehicle testers to save them the cost and time to register and tax every vehicle temporarily in their possession.

== Earlier schemes ==
The Netherlands introduced a system of vehicle registration plates on 26 April 1898 – the third country in the world to do so, after France in 1893 and Germany in 1896. A plate bearing the number 1 was issued to one J. van Dam, who purchased the first Dutch-built motorcar, which was manufactured at his own Groninger Motor-Rijtuigen Fabriek. Plate numbers stayed with the owner, unlike the present system. From 1906, a new system used the format xx-ddddd, where xx was a province code and ddddd a serial number. This system lasted until 1951 when the current system was introduced.

=== Province codes ===
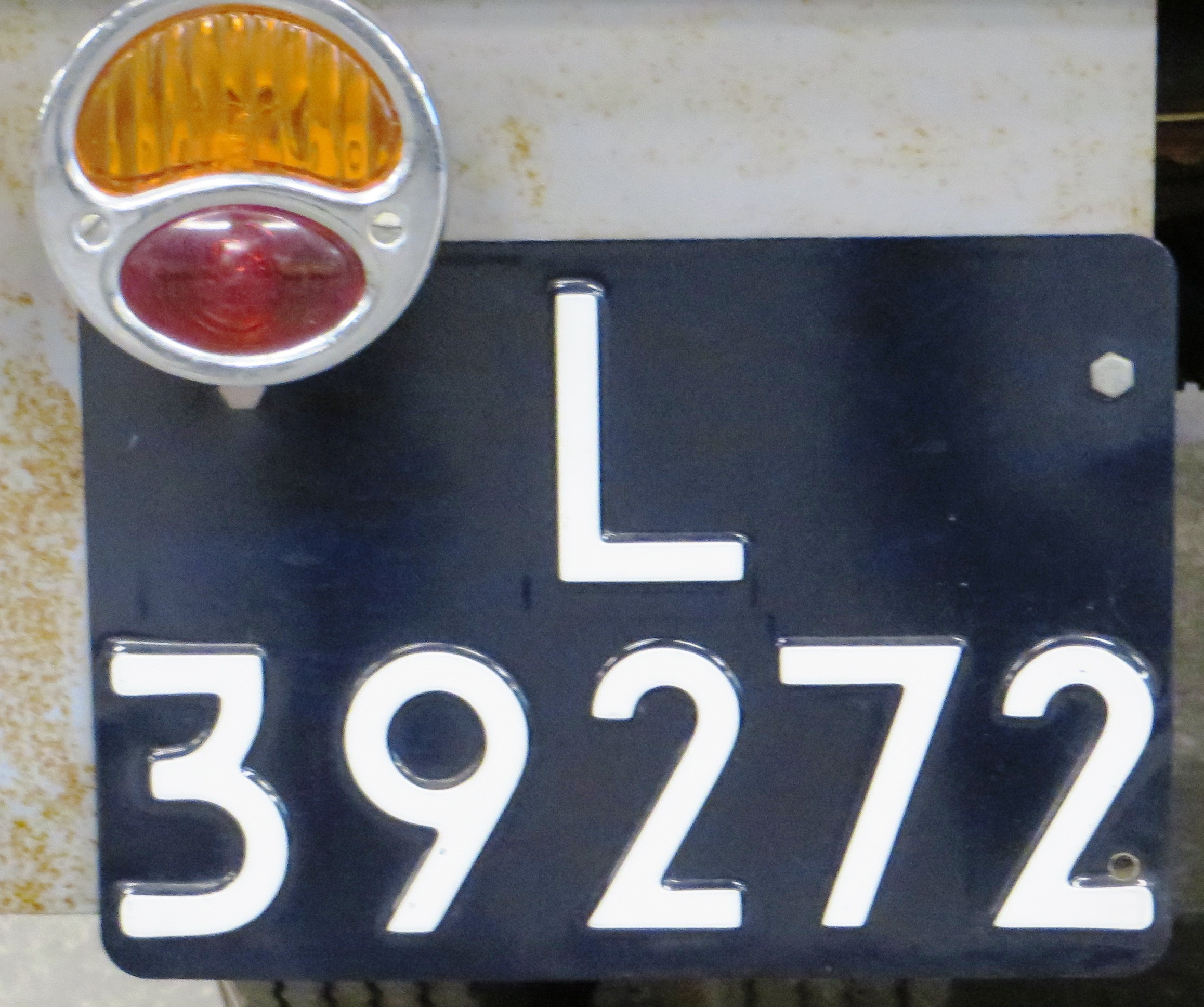

- A: Groningen
- B: Friesland
- D: Drenthe
- E: Overijssel
- G, GZ, GX: North Holland
- H, HZ, HX: South Holland
- K: Zeeland
- M: Gelderland
- N: North Brabant
- L: Utrecht
- P: Limburg
- R: overseas areas.

== Numbering schemes ==
The current Dutch license plate system uses black letters on a light-reflecting yellow background, although white reflecting letters on a dark-blue background are allowed for vehicles built before 1977. Since 2000, the blue band with the European flag and NL has been mandatory for all vehicles except vehicles built before 1977.

Dutch license plates can be formatted as follows:

Year	Format	Format (Sidecode)	Comment	First license plate (private cars)
1951–1965		1	This series is currently in use for imported oldtimers (pre-1985), using leftover serial letters not originally issued. The series DE, DH, DL, DM, DR, AE, AH, AL, AM, AR, DZ, PM and RM (RM from 16 July 2025) are now used. ZM, ZF, and NM for motorcycles, and BE (and from June 2021 BH) for oldtimer commercial vehicles. No xx-00-00.	ND-00-01
1965–1973		2	This series is currently in use for special permit vehicles (ZZ). No 00-00-xx.	00-01-AD
1973–1978		3	Light blue and yellow plates were first introduced in 1975, they were slightly larger than the dark blue ones. The light blue ones became mandatory from 1 January 1976. The yellow, reflecting plates were initially optional but became mandatory from 1 January 1978, a few months before this series ended. This series is currently in use for imported 'youngtimers' between 10 and 40 years old from now, starting with Y (YA, YB, YD and YE are currently issued) No 00-xx-00.	00-AD-01
1978–1991		4	The letters K and Y were used as serial letters in this series. Y only in sidecode 4. This series is currently issued to semi-trailers (O). No double zero allowed. No ZP in the first letter pair.	DB-01-BB
1991–1999		5	The letter K was not used as a serial letter in this series. No double zero.	DB-BB-01
1999–2008		6	In 2000, the Controlled Issuance and Intake of Licence Plates (GAIK; Gecontroleerde Afgave en Inname van Kentekenplaten) license style started with the F series in this series. All license plates except some oldtimer registrations were mandated to change to GAIK plates. No double zero allowed. In the first letter pair, neither DK nor VK. In V-series K from 01-VH-NK.	01-DB-BB
2006–present		7	At mopeds (D/F); no double zero allowed. And also for heavy goods vehicles (B) and trailers above 750 kg (W), in both series double zero allowed. From March 26, 2026 also for motorcycles (M). No single zero allowed at all. No VSB to VSZ.	01-GBB-1
2006–present		8	In this series, the first letters B, D, F, G, H, J, M, N, P, and R are not used, not to clash with export license plates. Therefore, the first letters in car plates can be only K, S, T, X, and Z. V is used for light commercial vehicles, no VVD. W will probably be used for trailers in the future. No single zero.	1-KBB-00
2006–present		9	The letter L is reserved for agricultural vehicles. No SD-001-B to SD-999-Z and no SS-001-B to SS-999-Z. Also no SP-155-P to SP-999-Z. Incl. 18-2-2025 also for trucks with license plate B. No triple zero.	GB-001-B
2011–present		10	No x-001-SD to x-999-SD and no x-001-SS to x-999-SS. Also no S-001-DB to S-999-DZ. No triple zero.	G-001-BB
2015–present		11	This series is currently issued to mopeds (D/F) and was used for light commercial vehicles (V), no VVD No VVD-01-B till VVD-99-Z, And since 1 January 2021 also for agricultural vehicles (L) and tractors (T) and from 4 June 2024 for passenger cars too, starting with GBB-01-B followed by H, J, K and N (also KGB!). No double zero.	GBB-01-B
2021–present		12	Since 31 December 2021 in use by tractors from T-01-BBB and since 8 January 2024 also in use by light commercial vehicles from V-01-BBB. And since 1 July 2025 also by electric scooters from E-01-BBD. In all this three series no double zero. BBB will now no longer used because BBB is a political party.	-
2016–present		13	This series is currently issued for fast motorboats (Y) and was used for tractors (0-GV-001 to 9-GV-999) between 2016 and 2020. From 2021 side code 11 and 12 are issued for tractors. 0-GV-000 to 9-GV-000 are not used.	-
2016–2020		14	This series was used for tractors to 456-GV-4 and 000-GV-0 to 000-GV-4 is not used. From 2021 side code 11 and 12 are issued for tractors.	-

Nowadays the letters used do not include vowels, to avoid profane or obscene language. To avoid confusion with the number zero, the letters C and Q are also omitted and letters M and W are not used because they are too wide.

Several combinations are banned on Dutch license plates to prevent obscenity, controversial political or historical references, and to ensure clarity and distinctiveness for vehicles. Here's the list:

- BBB (political party) in sidecode 12, but there is T-01-BBB to T-99-BBB and V-01-BBB to V-42-BBB.
- FVD (also a political party) but there is T-01-FVD to T-99-FVD
- GVD (a common Dutch expletive)
- KGB (Soviet state security agency) not in sidecode 12
- KKK (Ku Klux Klan)
- KVT (a potential expletive)
- LPF (a former political party)
- NSB (the Dutch National Socialist Movement) Despite the ban, in November 2010, due to an error, approximately one hundred plates with the initials NSB were issued and subsequently withdrawn.
- PKK (Kurdistan Workers' Party)
- PSV (a major football club, to maintain neutrality)
- PVV (a major political party, to maintain neutrality)
- SGP (a major political party, to maintain neutrality)
- SA (Nazi Sturmabteilung)
- SD (Sicherheitsdienst, a Nazi intelligence agency)
- SS (Nazi Schutzstaffel)
- TBS (a measure for offenders with a psychiatric disorder)
- VVD (a major political party, to maintain neutrality) not in sidecodes 8 and 11. It is possible to replace a VVD license plate with side code 7 with a non-VVD license plate free of charge.

Letters and numbers are issued in strict alphabetical/numeric order. Thus a Dutch license plate indicates the date of registration of a car, but no information about where in the country the car comes from, or to whom it belongs.

== Other formats ==
With the introduction of the GAIK series, several other formats have been introduced as well. All background colors used are retroreflective.

Format	Comment
XX-XX-99	Taxi plates are mandatory since December 2000 for vehicles used to transport people, but which are not part of the public transportation system.
XX-99-99	Trader plates, used by automotive companies to register current stock under their insurance, these plates are to be used if the car is used for a test drive and has no insurance on its license plate. It is forbidden to park a car on the public road with trader plates fitted.
XX-XX-99 Z-99-99	Used for trailers with a maximum weight of less than 750 kg, registration matches the vehicle pulling the trailer. Also used for export, temporary and provisional (single coded, H for 1 month and Z for 1 week) vehicles.

== Recent changes ==
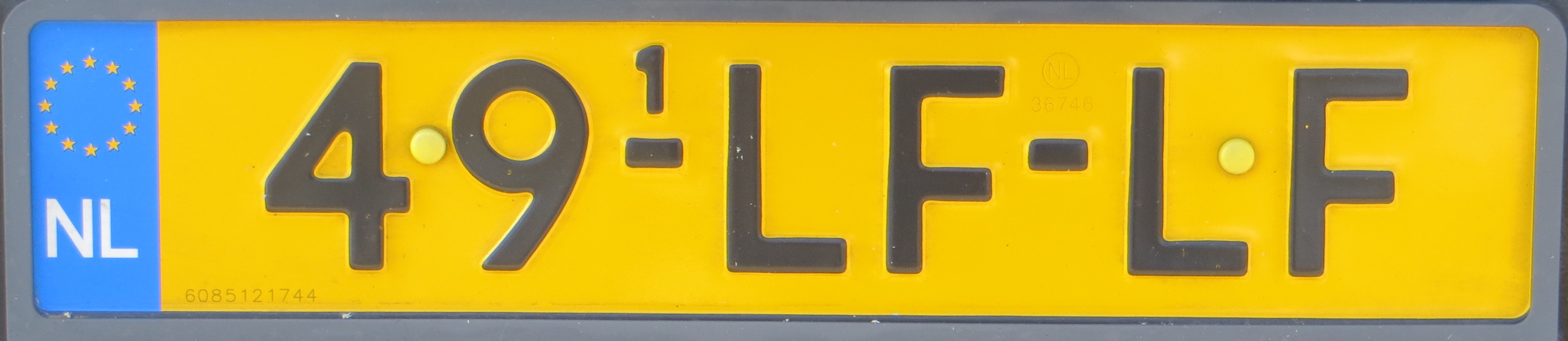
Dutch license plate with duplicate code 1

License plates subtly changed shape in 2002 when a new font was introduced, amongst other changes.

- Combatting fraudulent reports of stolen license plates, license plates are replaced immediately but using the same number. The new license plate is tagged with a small number 1 over the first dash, which is increased with each new plate.
- A blue background is used for taxis.
- White letters on a blue or black background are used for classic cars older than 1 January 1978 and with a registration number in sidecode 1, 2, or 3.
- Black letters on a white background are used for small trailers that hide the car's actual license plate.
- Large trailers, caravans, etc. now have black/yellow license plates.
- The letter Y is no longer used for cars, but instead for fast motorboats.
- The letter combinations SDB to SDZ as well as SSB to SSZ are not issued as SD, SS and SA continue to have fascist connotations in the Netherlands. Registrations with the letter combination NSB were issued in 2010, although these were recalled because these were the initials of the Nationaal-Socialistische Beweging.
- The letter combination KGB is not issued in side code 12.

== Current series ==
=== Motor cars ===
- 01-DB-BB, registration 1999/2000 No K as second letter.
- 01-FB-BB, registration 2000
- 01-GB-BB, registration 2000/2001
- 01-HB-BB, registration 2001/2002
- 01-JB-BB, registration 2002
- 01-LB-BB, registration 2002/2003
- 01-NB-BB, registration 2003/2004
- 01-PB-BB, registration 2004/2005
- 01-RB-BB, registration 2005
- 01-SB-BB, registration 2005/2006
- 01-TB-BB, registration 2006/2007
- 01-XB-BB, registration 2007
- 01-ZB-BB, registration 2007/2008 till 76-ZS-KB
- 01-GBB-1, registration 2008 (no 00-GBB-1 and no 00-GBB-2) (no GVD)
- 00-HBB-1, registration 2008/2009
- 00-JBB-1, registration 2009
- 00-KBB-1, registration 2009/2010 (no KKK)
- 00-LBB-1, registration 2010 (no LPF)
- 00-NBB-1, registration 2010/2011 (no NSB)
- 00-PBB-1, registration 2011 (no PKK and no PSV and no PVV)
- 00-RBB-1, registration 2011
- 00-SBB-1, registration 2011 (no SGP and no SDB - SDZ and no SSB - SSZ)
- 00-TBB-1, registration 2012 (no TBS)
- 00-XBB-1, registration 2012
- 00-ZBB-1, registration 2012/2013 till 79-ZXT-2
- 1-KBB-00, registration 2013 (no KKK and no KVT)
- 1-SBB-00, registration 2013 (no SGP and no SDB - SDZ and no SSB - SSZ)
- 1-TBB-00, registration 2013/2014 (no TBS)
- 1-XBB-00, registration 2014
- 1-ZBB-00, registration 2014/2015 till 8-ZVK-67
- GB-001-B, registration 2015
- HB-001-B, registration 2015/2016
- JB-001-B, registration 2016
- KB-001-B, registration 2016
- (L was reserved for agricultural vehicles but was not used after the Tweede kamer voted against a proposal for agricultural licence plates. Sidecode 11 has been used for this purpose since 1-1-2021)
- NB-001-B, registration 2016/2017
- PB-001-B, registration 2017
- RB-001-B, registration 2017/2018
- SB-001-B, registration 2018 (SP only SP-001-B till SP-154-P)
- TB-001-B, registration 2018
- XB-001-B, registration 2018/2019
- ZB-001-B, registration 2019 till ZV-183-Z
- G-001-BB, registration 2019
- H-001-BB, registration 2019/2020
- J-001-BB, registration 2020
- K-001-BB, registration 2020/2021
- L-001-BB, registration 2021
- N-001-BB, registration 2021/2022
- P-001-BB, registration 2022
- R-001-BB, registration 2022
- S-001-BB, registration 2022/2023 No S-001-DB to S-999-DZ
- T-001-BB, registration 2023
- X-001-BB, registration 2023/2024
- Z-001-BB, registration 2024 till Z-671-SB
- GBB-01-B, registration 2024/2025
- HBB-01-B, registration 2025
- JBB-01-B, registration 2025/2026
- KBB-01-B, registration 2026 KGB (Soviet state security agency) is used!
- L is now being used for agricultural vehicles.
- NBB-01-B, registration 2026 (current series, now NGF-G)

..S-01-D to ..S-99-D and ..S-01-S to ..S-99-S will not be used, and also .SD-01-B to .SD-99-Z and .SS-01-B to .SS-99-Z will not be used to avoid SD and SS combinations.

=== Motorcycles ===
- MB-01-BB, registration 1979/1998
- MB-BB-01, registration 1998/2011
- 01-MB-BB, registration 2011/2026
- 00-MBB-1, registration 2026/present (current series, now MFB)

=== Mopeds ===
- 01-DBB-1, registration 2005/2006
- 01-FBB-1, registration 2006
- DB-001-B, registration 2006
- FB-001-B, registration 2006/2008
- D-001-BB, registration 2008/2011
- F-001-BB, registration 2011/2015
- DBB-01-B, registration 2015/2020
- FBB-01-B, registration 2020/present (current series, now FZG-F)

D/FBS-01-D to D/FBS-99-D and D/FBS-01-S to D/FBS-99-S is not used, to avoid SD and SS combinations. Also, D/FxS-01-D to D/FxS-99-D and D/FxS-01-S to D/FxS-99-S (x is the second letter, D till Z) will not be used; and this also for D/FSD-01-B till D/FSD-99-Z and D/FSS-01-B till D/FSS-99-Z for the same reason.

=== Trucks/Lorries (payload 3.5 tons or more) ===
- BB-BB-01, registration 1994/2012
- 00-BBB-1, registration 2012/2025 BSD and BSS are both not used to avoid SD and SS combinations.
- BB-001-B, (current series, now BF-D)

=== Trucks/Lorries (payload less than or 3.5 tons) ===
- VB-BB-01, registration 1991/1998
- 01-VB-BB, registration 1998/2002 K only from 01-VH-NK and no VK in the first letterpair.
- 01-BB-BB, registration 2002/2006
- 01-VBB-1, registration 2006/2009 (no 00-VSB-1 to 99-VSZ-9) ^
- 1-VBB-00, registration 2009/2012 (no 1-VVD-00 to 9-VVD-99)
- VB-001-B, registration 2012/2016
- V-001-BB, registration 2016/2019
- VBB-01-B, registration 2019/2024 No VVD-01-B to VVD-99-Z read below.
- V-01-BBB, registration 2024 till nowadays (now V-RRX)

^ It is possible to exchange a VVD plate for another license plate free of charge.

VBS-01-D to VBS-99-D and VBS-01-S to VBS-99-S is not used, to avoid SD and SS combinations. Also VxS-01-D to VxS-99-D and VxS-01-S to VxS-99-S (x is the second letter, D till Z) will not be used for the same reason. Also VSD-01-B to VSD-99-Z and VSS-01-B to VSS-99-Z is not be used for the same reason. No VVD-01-B to VVD-99-Z because VVD is a political party.

On 8 January 2024 after V-42-BBB follows immediately V-01-DBB because BBB is a political party. To avoid SD and SS combinations V-01-xSD till V-99-xSD and V-01-xSS till V-99-xSS is/will not used, x is D t/m Z. FVD, GVD, KGB, KKK, KVT, LPF, NSB and PKK are not used.

=== Trailers ===
- WB-00-01, registration 1963/1977
- 00-01-WB, registration 1977/1983
- 00-WB-01, registration 1983/1989
- WB-01-BB, registration 1989/2000
- WB-BB-01, registration 2000/2008
- 01-WB-BB, registration 2008/2021
- 00-WBB-1, registration 2021/present (current series, now WVS) (no WSD and no WSS)

=== Semi-Trailers ===
- OB-00-01, registration 1963/1988
- OB-01-BB, registration 1988/present (current series, now OX-KZ)

=== Agricultural Vehicles ===
- LBB-01-B, registration 2021/present (current series, now LSF-F)

LBS-01-D to LBS-99-D and LBS-01-S to LBS-99-S is not used to avoid SD and SS combinations. Also (in the future), LxS-01-D to LxS-99-D and LxS-01-S to LxS-99-S (x is the second letter, D till Z) and LSD is not used for the same reason. LPF is not used.

=== Tractors ===
- TBB-01-B, registration 2021. TBS is not used. TSD and TSS are both not used to avoid SD and SS combinations. TDS-01-D to TDS-99-D and TDS-01-S to TDS-99-S is not used, to avoid SD and SS combinations. Also TxS-01-D to TxS-99-D and TxS-01-S to TxS-99-S (x is the second letter, F to Z) is not be used, for the same reason. Also TSD-01-B to TSD-99-Z and TSS-01-B to TSS-99-Z is not be used for the same reason.
- T-01-BBB, registration 31 December 2021/present (current series, now T-HVF)

No T-..-xSD and no T-..-xSS, x is the second letter B to Z, to avoid SD and SS combinations. There exists T-01-FVD till T-99-FVD despite FVD is a political party! GVD is not used.

=== Electric scooters ===
- E-01-BBD registration 1 July 2025/present (current series, now E-BKZ). No BBB because BBB is a political party. Not only scooters, but all "special mopeds" fall into this categorie. For instance Segways. The color of these plates is blue.

And see now also The monthly update of the most latest license plates by the RDW on 31 October 2026.

== Special-use license plates ==
Letters	Description
B, E, S	Used in the Caribbean Netherlands. License plates are North American standard size and do not carry an EU flag. License plates start with one letter: B for Bonaire, E for St. Eustatius, and S for Saba, followed by three or four digits. The color of the plate differs per island. Some plates start with different letters, sometimes similar to that of the European Netherlands: V for commercial vehicles, TX for the taxi, D for governmental vehicles, AB for buses.
AA	Used for vehicles registered to the Dutch royal family. (AA-??) or (AA-???).
B	In sidecode 1, 2 and 3 the second letter is a B. In sidecode 4 the first letter is a B and later a V. From sidecode 5 the B in the first letter position is used to refer to a "Bedrijfswagen" (commercial vehicle): special status for cars that are exclusively used for commercial purposes with a load capacity of more than 3500 kilo. Commercial license registrations have a separate taxation class, though some 10% of the cars are registered as commercial. A commercial license is often called "grijs kenteken" (grey registration), referring to the previous color of the car's registration papers, which is now, like commercial vehicles, green. Please note: after sidecode 5 follows sidecode 7 and then sidecode 9!
V	From sidecode 5 the V, and in sidecode 6 also the B, in the first letter position is used to refer to a "Bedrijfswagen" (commercial vehicle): special status for cars that are exclusively used for commercial purposes with a load capacity of less than 3500 kilo. A commercial license is often called "grijs kenteken" (grey registration), referring to the previous color of the car's registration papers, which is now, like commercial vehicles, green.
BE, BH	Classic commercial vehicles. Sidecode 1. BE until June 2021, BH after it. Current high BH-12-35 (12 January 2026).
DE, DH, DL, DM, DR, AE, AH, AL, AM, AR, DZ, PM, and from 16 July 2025 RM	Imported classic cars 40 years or older. Sidecode 1. PM since August 2020. Current high RM-09-28 (12 January 2026).
ZM, ZF, NM	Secondhands motorbikes. Sidecode 1. NM since November 2017. Current high NM-51-09 (12 January 2026).
YA, YB, YD and YE	Imported classic cars older than 10 years but younger than 40 years. Sidecode 3. YD since July 2014. Current high 36-YE-32 (12 January 2026).
KL to KZ & LM, LO, LU, DM	Military Vehicles: (KL, KN to KZ: Royal Army, KM: Koninklijke Marine's (Royal Navy), LM: Luchtmacht (Air Force), KP: Regular car from the Koninklijke landmacht (Royal Army), KV: Koninklijke Marechaussee (Royal Constabulary). Example: (KL-??-??) and (??-KL-??) which are used by Royal Army. Also, DM but only in the sidecodes 7, 9, and 10. The third letter is B to Z but not an A, C, E, I, M, O, Q, U, W, or Y.
CD	"Corps Diplomatique" and is used for diplomats (CD-??-??) or (??-CD-??). After CD-99-99 follows CD-00-01 again. On 2 May 2026 CD-27-..
CDJ	Lawyers or Diplomats working for the International Court of Justice (CDJ-???).
BFG	Used for private vehicles of Dutch and German military servants working for British Forces Germany/NATO. They are issued by the Ministry of Defence and the Royal Military Police in Driebergen. They carry a different font, similar to that of the German license plates, to allow them to be produced in Germany if necessary.
RC	NATO vehicles. RC stands for "Région Centrale", dating from when NATO headquarters were located in France. Currently in use by Joint Force Command Brunssum. Newer license plates are yellow, look like the regular ones, and have dashes between the letters and numbers and in the middle of the numbers (similar to sidecode 1, but yellow plates).
M	Motorcycles. Several letters in sidecode 1. After that (MX-??-XX) to (??-MX-XX). M is only used as the first letter! In older sidecodes the M does not necessarily refer to a motorcycle.
BN or GN	For vehicles whose owner is not liable to taxation such as staff from embassies without diplomatic status, consulates or international organisations such as ESA, ICC, UN-ICJ or OPCW (BN or GN-??-??), (??-??-BN or GN), (??-BN or GN-??).
GV	Was intended for agricultural vehicles that within the Netherlands, did not need a license plate but would cross national borders with countries where they do (i.e. Belgium) (grensverkeer/border traffic) (GV-??-??). Later, since 2025, these tractors did get a licenseplate (starting with T). But vehicles that already had a GV plate could keep this. Originally a GV plate was only for 1 owner and his vehicle. When he would sell the tractor the license plate would not stay with the vehicle.
HA, HF, HH, FH, HC, OA	For car merchants, e.g. for test-drives with unregistered cars (green plate) (HA or HF or HH or FH-??-??). For mopeds HC in sidecode, 1 is used. Trailers get OA.
HH	Dutch mopeds abroad (has been abolished with the introduction of registration plates for mopeds in 2005) (HH-??-??).
ZZ	For vehicles with a special exemption to enter public roads, such as cranes. Vehicles with these license plates do not need a periodic check-up. The extra-long, double articulated buses in Utrecht also carry ZZ license plates (ZZ-??-??) and (??-??-ZZ). Sidecode 1 until December 2016, sidecode 2 thereafter. Sidecode 2 is divided into three subseries: "open" series from 00-01-ZZ to 03-73-ZZ (not issued after 5 July 2018), test vehicles from 10-00-ZZ to 10-06-ZZ, and normal ZZ-vehicles from 20-00-ZZ to 35-42-ZZ (12 January 2026).
O	Semi-trailers ('O'pleggers). (OX-??-?? or OX-??-XX) OX-59-BD (12 January 2026). O is only used as the first letter.
W	Trailers and caravans with an allowed weight > 750 kg having own registration. Currently in sidecode 7. W is used only as the first letter.
AF	Used by Allied Forces Northern Europe vehicles. (AF-XX-??) The letter M is used in the second letterpair. See the fifth and the sixth photo from the bottom on https://www.olavsplates.com/netherlands12.html
MM-BS and LBT in sidecode 8	Used for cars which have a limited speed 25 or 40 km/h
E	Electric steps or scooter. Described as "special moped": vehicles that are electrically powered and do not match the category Moped. Read the text under Kenteken voor elektrische step on https://nos.nl/artikel/2572921-dit-verandert-op-1-juli-kenteken-voor-elektrische-step-en-streep-door-designerdrugs and read also https://www.rdw.nl/nieuws/2025/eerste-e-step-met-goedkeuring-en-kenteken and see now also https://www.instagram.com/p/DLkuabehD9c/ and read also https://www.rdw.nl/paginas/kenteken-aanvragen-voor-uw-bijzondere-bromfiets

This list is not exhaustive. The Dutch Wikipedia article Nederlands kenteken contains more exceptions.

== Vehicle registration ==
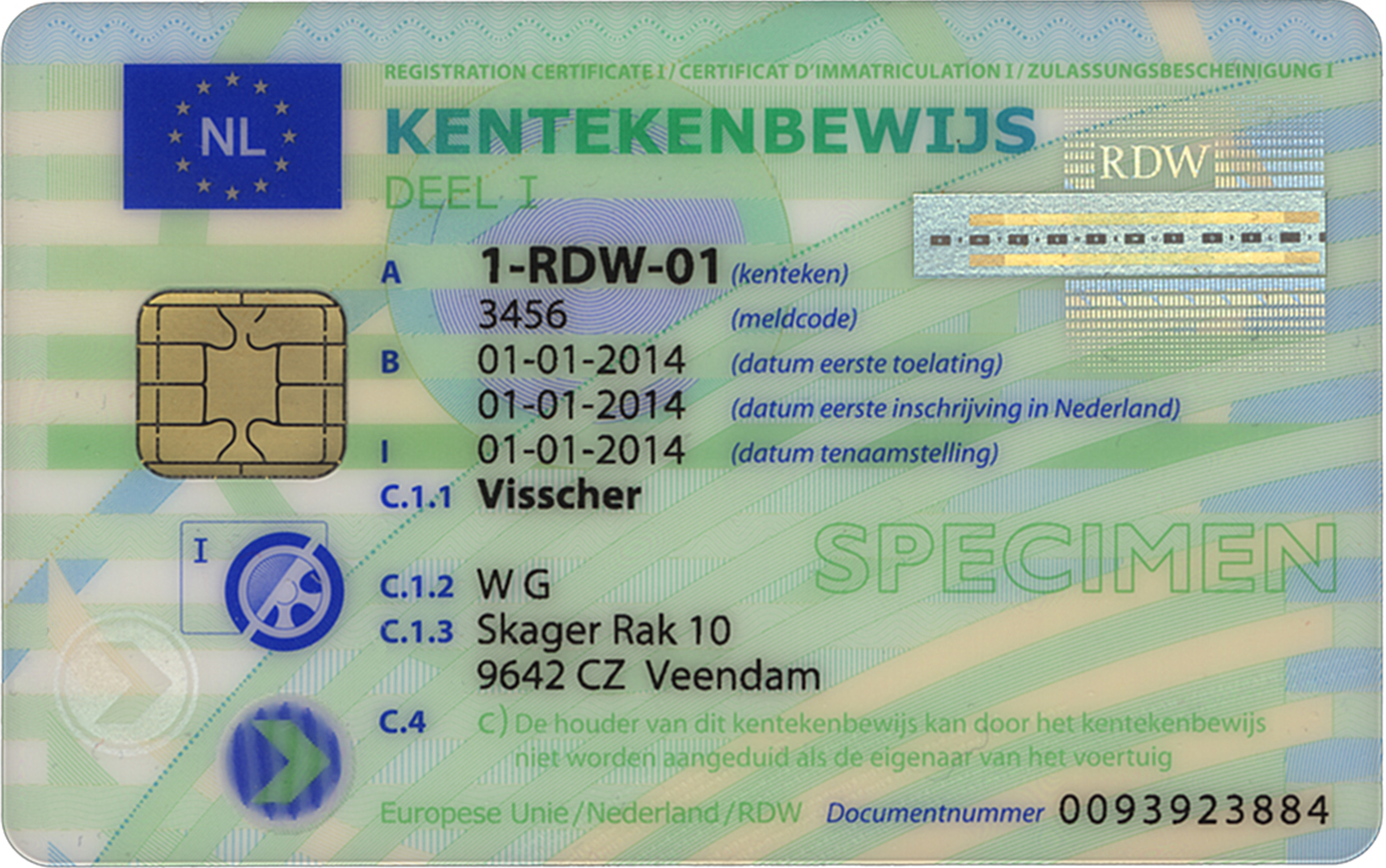
Vehicle registration card

Since 1 January 2014, the Netherlands has had an all-plastic vehicle registration in credit card format. This and the driving license (which is the same size) are the only things needed to bring along while driving in the Netherlands. This registration has the same green appearance for every vehicle category, only the information on the card differs. It has a chip with more detailed information about the vehicle. All previously issued vehicle registrations will remain valid until the car changes ownership, or until the owner requests replacement vehicle registration documents. While a so-called overschrijvingsbewijs (a separate document that came with the vehicle registration) was needed previously to sell the vehicle, this has now been replaced with a code. The registration card and the correct code are enough to sell the vehicle, even without the original letter stating the code as issued during the new car registration.
