= Move over law =

Right-of-way traffic law

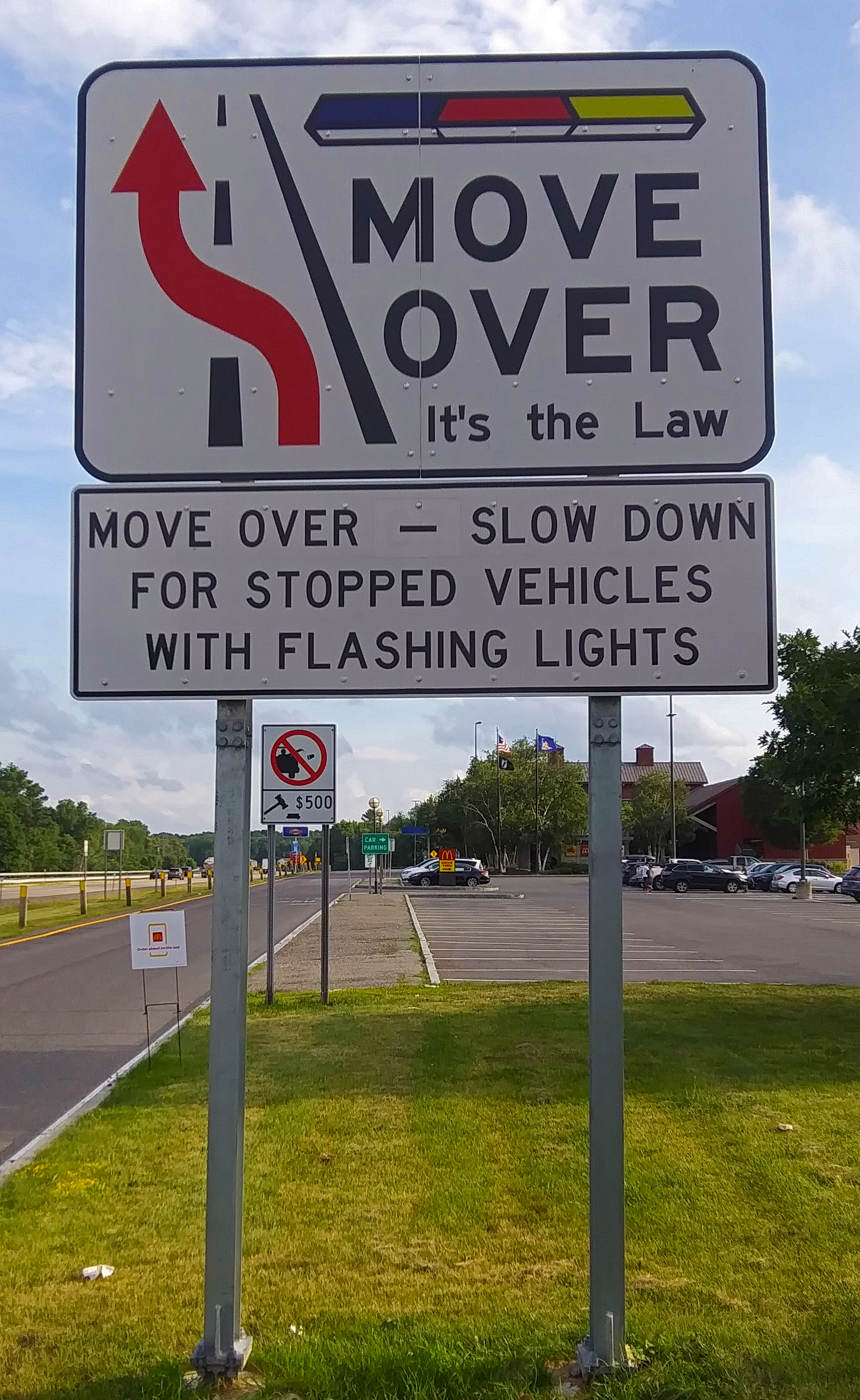
A sign informing motorists of the state move-over law at a New York State Thruway service area

A move over law is a law which requires motorists to move over and change lanes to give safe clearance to law enforcement officers, firefighters, ambulances, utility workers, and in some cases, tow-truck drivers and disabled vehicles. In the past, Canada and the United States have used this term to apply to two different concepts; however, this is beginning to change as Canadian provinces have begun expanding the scope of their move over laws.

== In Canada ==
In Canada, move over laws require motorists, upon noticing an incoming emergency vehicle (coming from any direction) with sirens or flashing lights operating, to move to the shoulder and stop, until the vehicle has passed the vicinity. This gives emergency vehicles a clear roadway for responding to emergencies, encouraging the fast response of emergency vehicles.

The Province of Ontario's Ministry of Transportation and the Province of Saskatchewan's Ministry of Highways and Infrastructure were the first to implement move over laws. Quebec was the last province to implement a move over law, which came into effect on 5 August 2012.

In 2005, the government of Alberta expanded the scope of the province's move over laws. Amendments were made to the province's Traffic Safety Act to require drivers to either slow down or move over when passing emergency vehicles or tow trucks stopped on the side of a highway when their "flashing lamps are operating." The maximum speed for passing stationary emergency vehicles or tow trucks was set at 60 km/h, and the fines for exceeding that speed were doubled.

In 2012, Quebec established a move over law] (Corridor de sécurité, or safety corridor). Unlike other laws found in US states and Canadian provinces, the Quebec law had broader application. Drivers would have to slow down and provide a buffer lane to a stopped service vehicle with active strobing/rotating lights or active traffic arrow. The service vehicles may be tow trucks, emergency vehicles (ambulance, police, fire), or highway department patrol vehicles.

In 2015, Ontario modified the Highway Traffic Act, stating motorists shall slow down and proceed with caution, moving over if multiple lanes exist, when approaching stopped tow trucks producing intermittent flashes of amber light. The section does not define tow trucks as "emergency vehicles".

== In the United States ==
In the United States, move over laws refer to requiring drivers to give a one lane buffer to stopped emergency vehicles. For example, while driving in the right lane, if the driver sees a stopped police car, the driver is required to move one lane over to the left to give enough buffer space to avoid any potential accidents.

The move over law originated in Lexington, South Carolina, after James D. Garcia, a paramedic, was struck and injured at an accident scene on 28 January 1994, when attempting to assist a driver that had slid off of the road. The South Carolina Highway Patrol listed Garcia at fault, leading to his work to create this law. The South Carolina General Assembly passed the "move over law" in 1996 and was revised in 2002 to increase the ease of enforcement and fines.

After a series of similar events across the US in 2000, the US Department of Transportation and Federal Highway Administration began to address the issue of Emergency Scene Safety, and issued recommended changes for the new Manual of Uniform Traffic Control Devices (MUTCD) that finally addressed the need for improved standards and protection for emergency workers. With the further assistance of public interest groups such as the Emergency Responder Safety Institute, move over laws became standard across the US and Canada.

In the United States, move over laws are aimed at protecting emergency responders working along the roadside. All fifty states have passed such laws, which were promoted in response to increasing roadside fatalities in the line of duty. The laws require drivers, upon noticing an emergency vehicle with sirens and/or flashing lights, to move away from the vehicle by one lane, or if that is not possible, slow down to either a reasonable speed or a fixed speed below the limit as defined by local law. This includes law enforcement vehicles, fire trucks and ambulances. In New York State, drivers must use due care when approaching an emergency vehicle that displays red and/or white emergency lighting such as law enforcement vehicles, fire trucks and ambulances and also vehicles with flashing amber lighting such as tow trucks, construction vehicles and other service workers stopped along the side of the road while performing their duties. Since 1 July 2018, in Iowa, drivers must move over or slow down for any vehicle with flashing hazard lights.

Move over laws in some states (i.e., Mississippi, Pennsylvania, Rhode Island, South Dakota) do not require drivers to change lanes. In states that do, move over laws differ in terms of specificity regarding driver action. Some observed move over laws are somewhat vague in the actions required of the driver (i.e., use due care not to collide, provide as much space as practical, etc.) while other laws provide explicit direction (move to a non-adjacent lane, move to a lane farthest away from the emergency vehicle, etc).

Kansas was the first state to enact the law in 2000. Hawaii was the most recent state to pass the law in 2012.

Currently, only Washington, D.C., does not have a move over law. On 17 June 2009, Connecticut Governor M. Jodi Rell signed House Bill 5894, establishing a Move Over requirement in the state. Connecticut's Move Over law took effect on 1 October 2009. On 13 August 2010, New York's governor signed a move over law to take effect on 1 January 2011. On 1 January 2012, the move over law was modified to include not only police, fire trucks, and ambulances, but also hazard vehicles, such as tow trucks. Maryland's 'move over law provisions, which were approved by Governor O'Malley on 20 May 2010, came into effect on 1 October 2010. On 1 October 2012, North Carolina's newly revised move over law, which was expanded to include utility and maintenance operations, went into effect.

== Differing concepts in other countries ==
In Germany, for autobahns and roads outside built-up areas with at least two lanes per direction a similar concept called Rettungsgasse ("emergency lane") was already established in 1971, based on a proposal of Karl-Heinz Kalow submitted on 29 March 1963. It requires drivers to move over (to the left in the left lane, to the right in the other lanes) and leave a corridor for potential emergency vehicles in any traffic jam, even if there is no accident or emergency vehicle in sight. It was further enforced in 1992 and refined in 2016. With modifications, this system is also implemented in Austria and Switzerland, and has been adapted in several other European countries including Belgium, the Czech Republic, Hungary and Spain.
