= VMS =

VMS may refer to:

== Communication and transportation ==
- Video management system, most often associated with digital CCTV surveillance
- Voice mail system, an alternate term for voicemail messaging
- An abbreviation for Vietnam Mobile Telecom Services, known as MobiFone
- Variable-message sign, an electronic traffic sign often used on highways
- Virgin mothership, a carrier plane for Virgin Galactic spacecraft (see Virgin Galactic#Motherships)
- Valley Metro system, in Phoenix, Arizona
- Vessel monitoring system, a tracking system for commercial fishing vessels
- The ICAO airline code of His Royal Highness The Crown Prince Maha Vajiralongkorn, a holding airline established under the name of King Rama X of Thailand that maintains legal ownership of his private fleet of aircraft

== Computers ==
- OpenVMS or VAX/VMS (Virtual Memory System), a computer operating system
- VMS (Visual Memory System) or VMU (Visual Memory Unit), a storage device for the Sega Dreamcast console
- Vulnerability management solution (or system)
- Vendor management system

== Schools ==
- Vail Mountain School, in Colorado
- Vaughn Municipal Schools in New Mexico
- Vallivue Middle School, in the Vallivue School District, Idaho
- Vandenberg Middle School, in the Lompoc Unified School District, California
- Vincent Mary School of Science and Technology, Suvarnabhumi Campus, Assumption University of Thailand
- Vivekananda Mission School, in West Bengal, India

== Other uses ==
- Visitor Management system for managing the check-in/check-out process for visitors, contractors or staff at premises.
- Vendor management system, for managing vendors or temporary staff
- Volcanogenic massive sulfide ore deposit
- Voluntary milking system, an alternate name for an automatic milking system in dairy farming
- Voynich manuscript, an illustrated codex hand-written in an unknown writing system
- Virginia Motor Speedway
- Vasomotor symptoms, or hot flashes, a symptom of menopause
