= Right-in/right-out =

Type of road intersection

Right-in/right-out (RIRO) and left-in/left-out (LILO) refer to a type of three-way road intersection where turning movements of vehicles are restricted. A RIRO permits only right turns and a LILO permits only left turns. "Right-in" and "left-in" refer to turns from a main road into an intersection (or a driveway or parcel); "right-out" and "left-out" refer to turns from an intersection (or a driveway or parcel) to a main road. RIRO is typical when vehicles drive on the right, and LILO is usual where vehicles drive on the left. This is because minor roads usually connect to the outsides of two-way roads. However, on a divided highway, both RIRO and LILO intersections can occur.

The remainder of this article refers only to RIRO but applies equally to LILO.

A RIRO intersection differs from a 3/4 intersection (right in/right out/left in) and an unrestricted intersection.

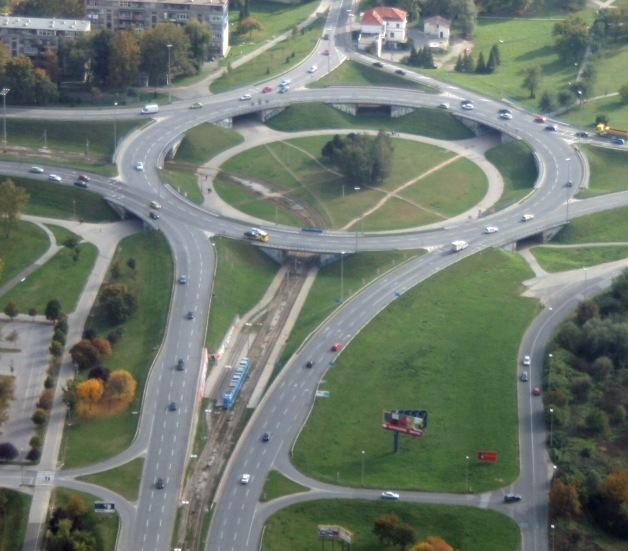
(Lower left) RIRO ramps on and off a divided highway connecting to the Remetinec Roundabout in Zagreb, Croatia.

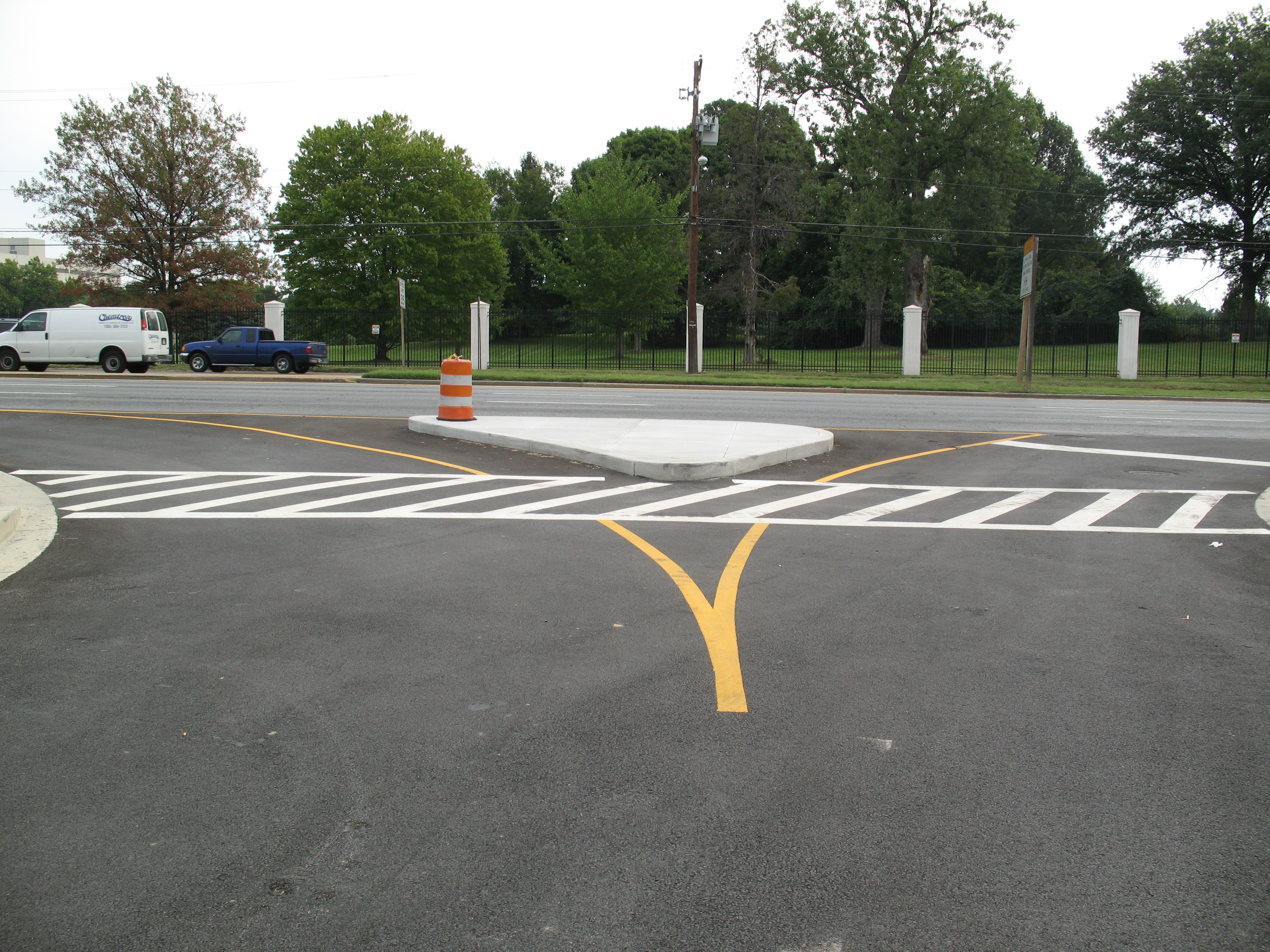
A right-in/right-out intersection at the entrance to the National Institutes of Health along Maryland Route 355 in Bethesda, Maryland, United States.

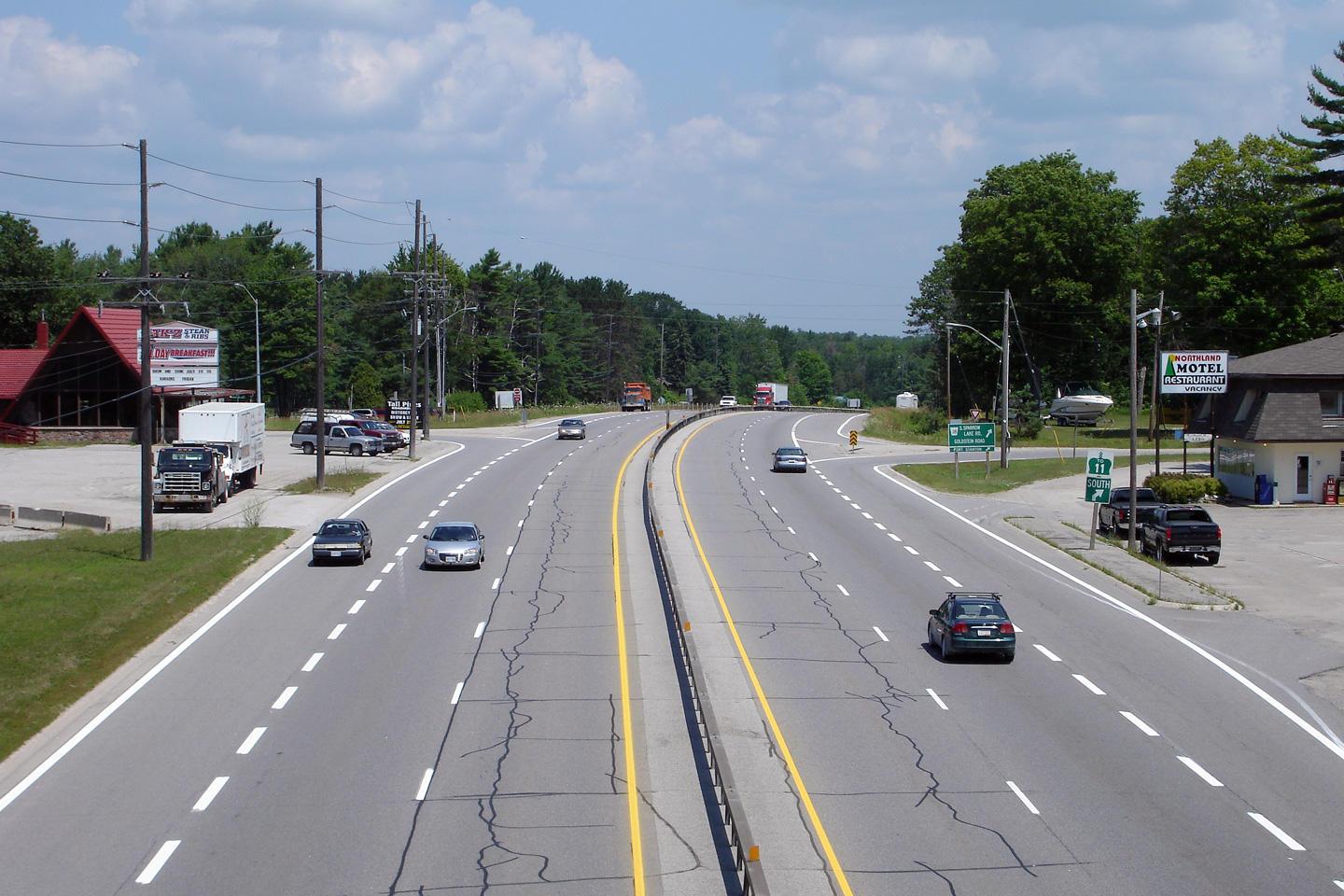
King's Highway 11, looking north from overpass, toward South Sparrow Lake Road/Goldstein Road in Severn, Ontario, Canada. Several characteristics of a RIRO expressway are shown in the image: there is an unbroken median, there are right-in/right-out turns at the side roads, there are businesses with direct right-in/right-out frontage along the highway, and there is a sign indicating that access to the southbound lanes of the highway is via a right turn onto the side road (in this case, by following Goldstein Road to the overpass road, crossing over the highway, then continuing on the overpass road to South Sparrow Lake Road).

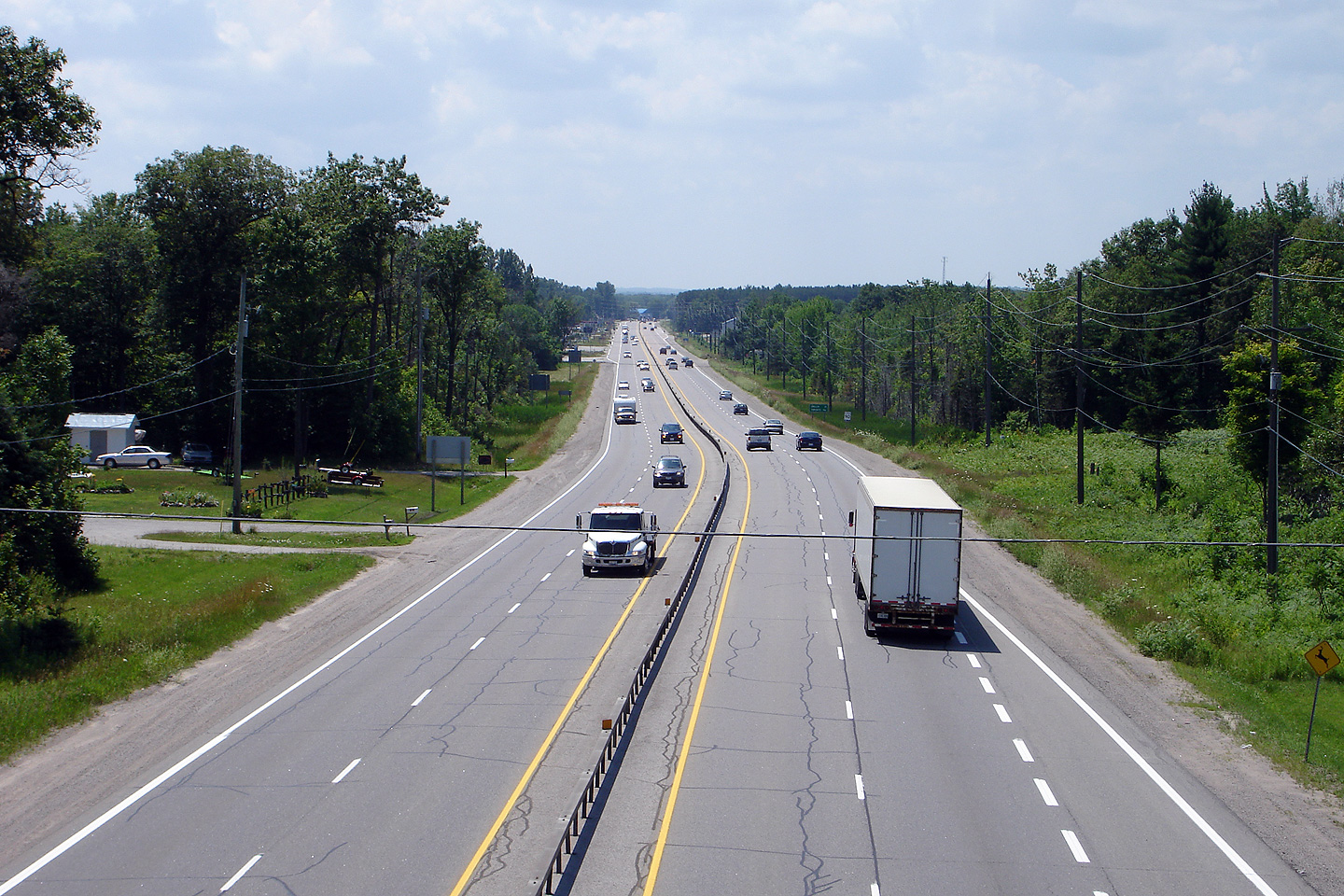
King's Highway 11, looking south from same overpass. In addition to the unbroken median, this image shows another characteristic of a RIRO expressway: direct right-in/right-out access to driveways (in this case, residential).

== Design ==
RIRO is an important tool of access management, itself an important component of transportation planning. A study applying access management guidelines to the redesign of Missouri Route 763 in Columbia, Missouri illustrates how RIRO, combined with signalized intersections designed to permit U-turns, can accommodate high volumes of traffic with low delay and high safety.

The RIRO restriction typically is enforced through physical barriers such as a traffic island in an intersection to direct vehicles into the permitted turn, and to restrict vehicles from traveling through the intersection. The major road itself often has a median separating the two directions of traffic. The restriction may also be achieved by signage, but when a median or other barrier is not present in the median of the major road, RIRO configurations have been found to result in significant violation rates.

RIRO roads may also have grade-separated interchanges, but vehicles on these roads do not yield the right-of-way to other vehicles entering the roadway, nor encounter cross traffic. Such roads are sometimes called RIRO expressways. In the United States, they are sometimes called Jersey freeways, due to their prevalence in the state of New Jersey, although they are not limited to that state.

== Use ==
RIRO road configurations are an important tool for access management. General types of RIRO road configuration include limited access roads (e.g. divided highways) and roundabouts. To travel in the restricted direction, vehicles must first turn in the permitted direction, then reverse direction in a U-turn, by going around a roundabout, reversing direction at an interchange with an overpass or underpass, or by going left around a block. RIRO is especially useful where left turns would require crossing in front of oncoming vehicles.

== Safety ==
RIRO configurations generally improve road-traffic safety and efficiency by reducing the number of conflict points between vehicles.

A RIRO configuration may improve safety and operations at one intersection while consequently worsening them at another intersection upstream or downstream.
