= Landmark Hotel =

The phrase "landmark hotel" is frequently used to generically describe historically or architecturally significant hotels throughout the world, and is often tied to designated status as a national, Regional, State or Local historic landmark.

Hotels called the Landmark Hotel, or something similar, include:

- Empire Landmark Hotel, in Vancouver, British Columbia
- Faust Landmark, Rockford, Illinois
- Hotel Landmark Canton
- InterContinental Hanoi Landmark 72 is an InterContinental hotel in Hanoi
- Landmark Hotel (Bangkok), Thailand
- Landmark Hotel (New Orleans), located in the suburb of Metairie, Louisiana
- Landmark Hotel (Port Harcourt), Rivers State
- Landmark Mandarin Oriental located in The Landmark office and shopping development in Hong Kong
- Safi Landmark Hotel in Kabul, Afghanistan
- Seminole Cafe and Hotel, now known as the Landmark Hotel, in Homestead, Florida. It is listed on the National Register of Historic Places.
- The Landmark Hotel and Casino, a hotel-casino in Las Vegas, Nevada that was imploded in 1995
- The Landmark London, formerly the Great Central Hotel

== See also ==
- Landmark Inn, Marquette, Michigan
- Landmark Inn State Historic Site in Castroville, Texas
