= Changing room =

Room where one can change their clothes

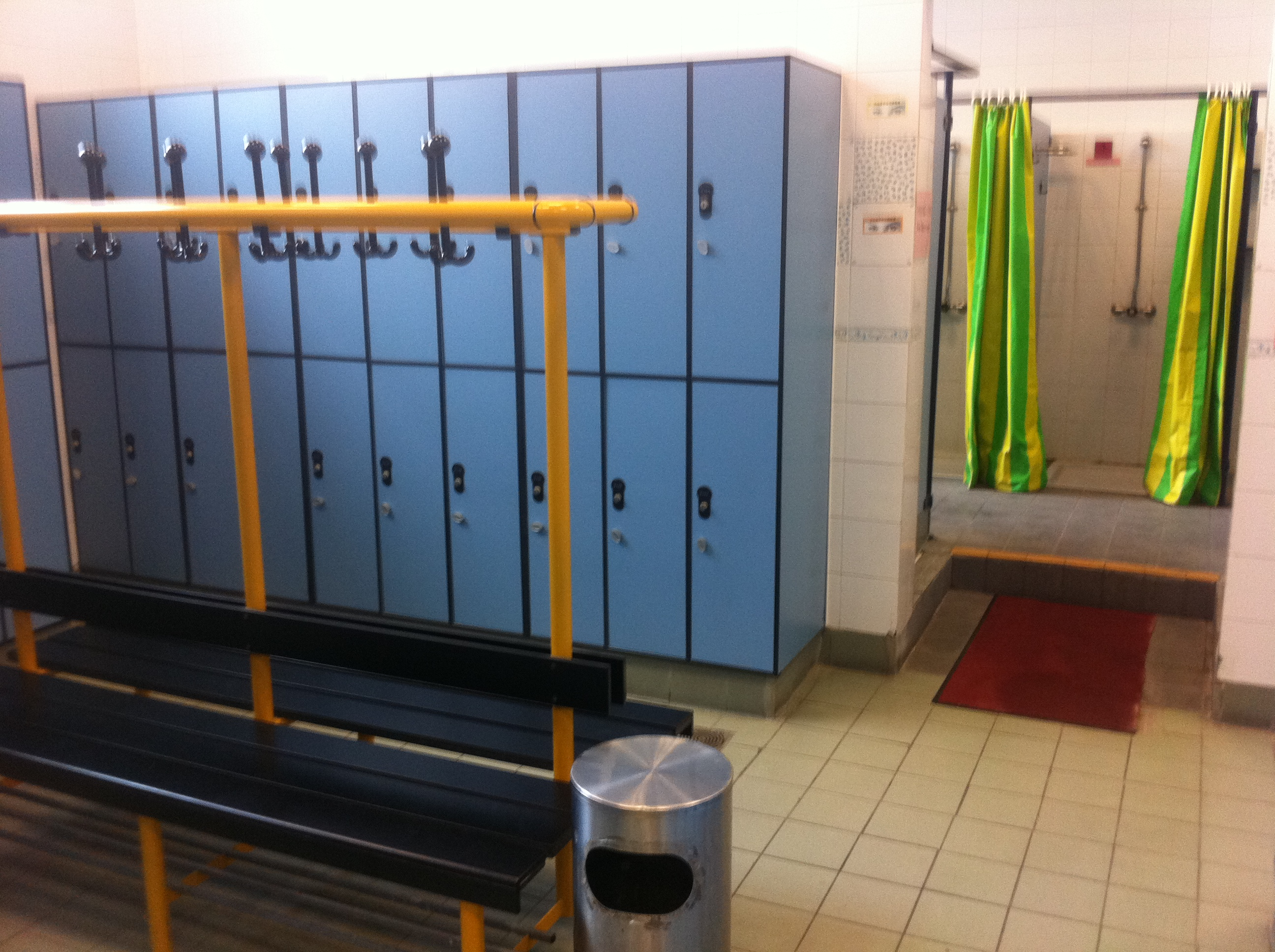
Changing room inside a sports hall

A changing room, locker room (usually in a sports, theater, or staff context), or changeroom (regional use), or dressing room (theatre term) is a room or area designated for changing one's clothes. Changing-rooms are provided in a semi-public situation to enable people to change clothes with varying degrees of privacy.

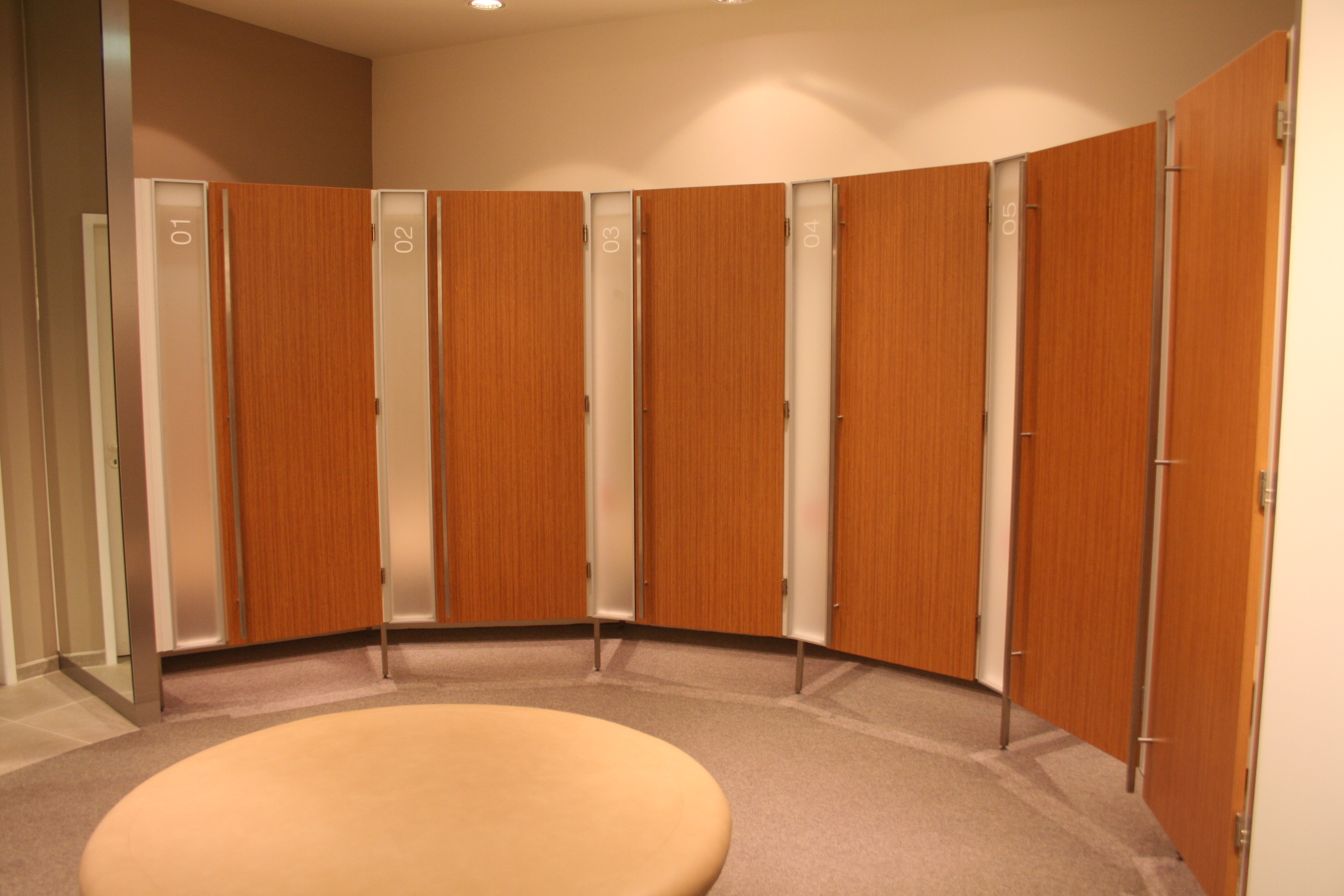
A block of clothing store fitting rooms in Denmark

A fitting room, or dressing room, is a room where people try on clothes, such as in a department store.

Separate changing rooms may be provided for men and women, or there may be a non-gender-specific open space with individual cubicles or stalls, as with unisex public toilets. Many changing rooms include toilets, sinks and showers. Sometimes a changing room exists as a small portion of a restroom/washroom. For example, the men's and women's washrooms in Toronto's Sankofa Square (formerly Yonge–Dundas Square) (which includes a water play area) each include a change area which is a blank counter space at the end of a row of sinks. In this case, the facility is primarily a washroom, and its use as a changing room is minimal, since only a small percentage of users change into bathing suits. Sometimes a person may change their clothes in a toilet cubicle of a washroom.

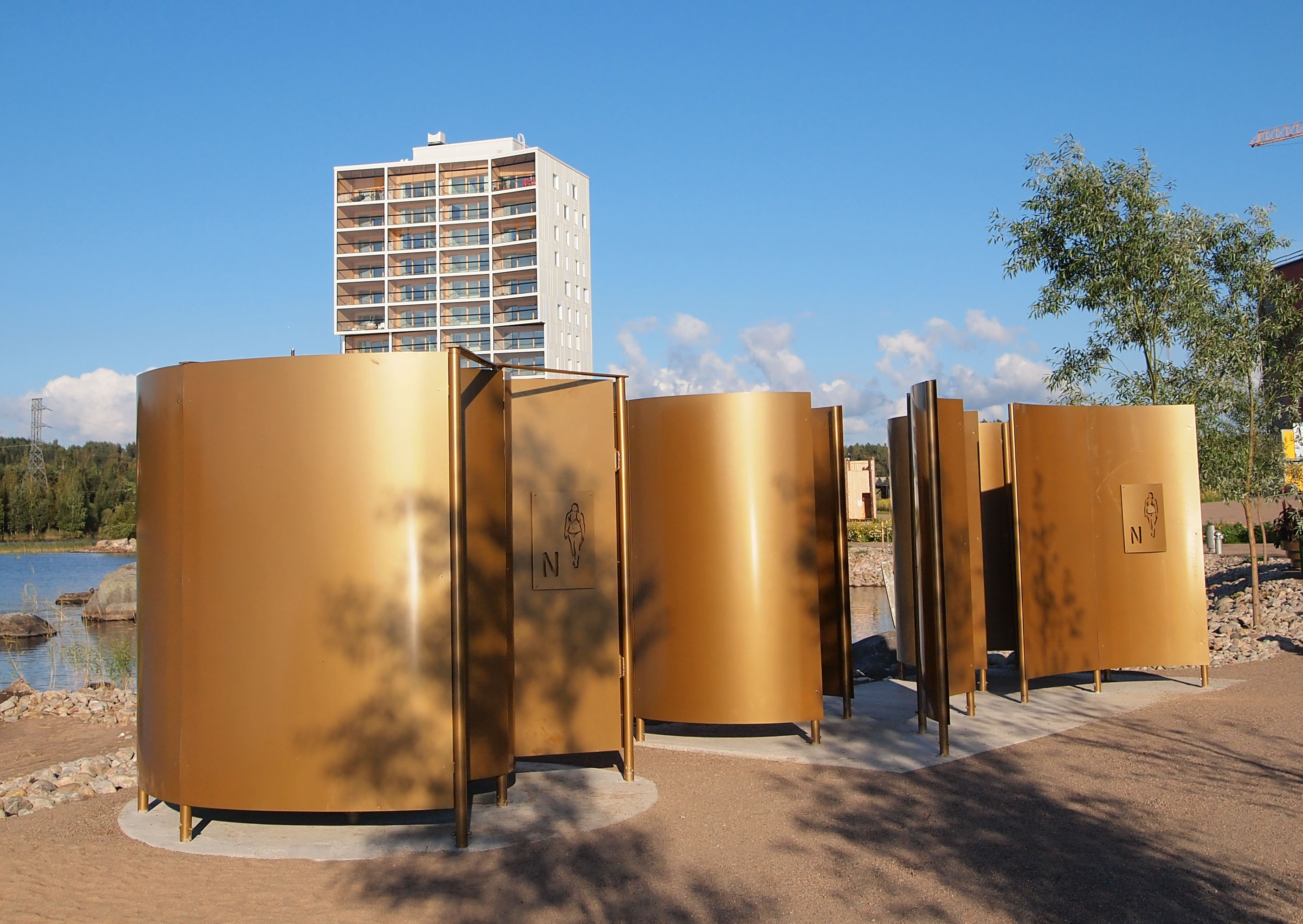
Changing rooms at the Äijälänranta Beach in Jyväskylä, Finland

Larger changing rooms are usually found at public beaches, or other bathing areas, where most of the space is for changing, and minimal washroom space is included. Beach-style changing rooms are often large open rooms with benches against the walls. Some do not have a roof, providing just the barrier necessary to prevent people outside from seeing in.

== Types ==
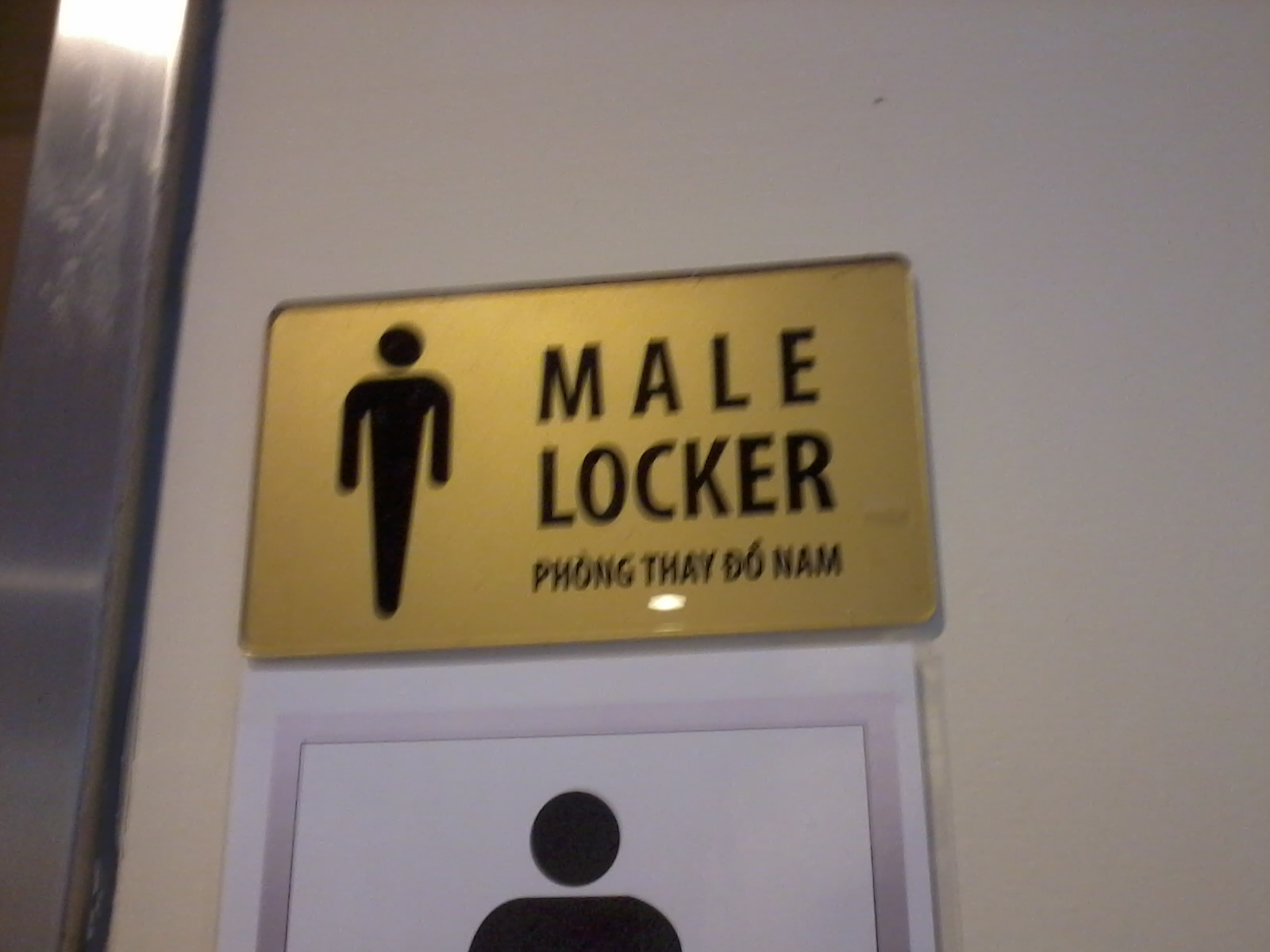
Changing room sign of swimming-pool at Keangnam Hanoi Landmark Tower, Hanoi, Vietnam

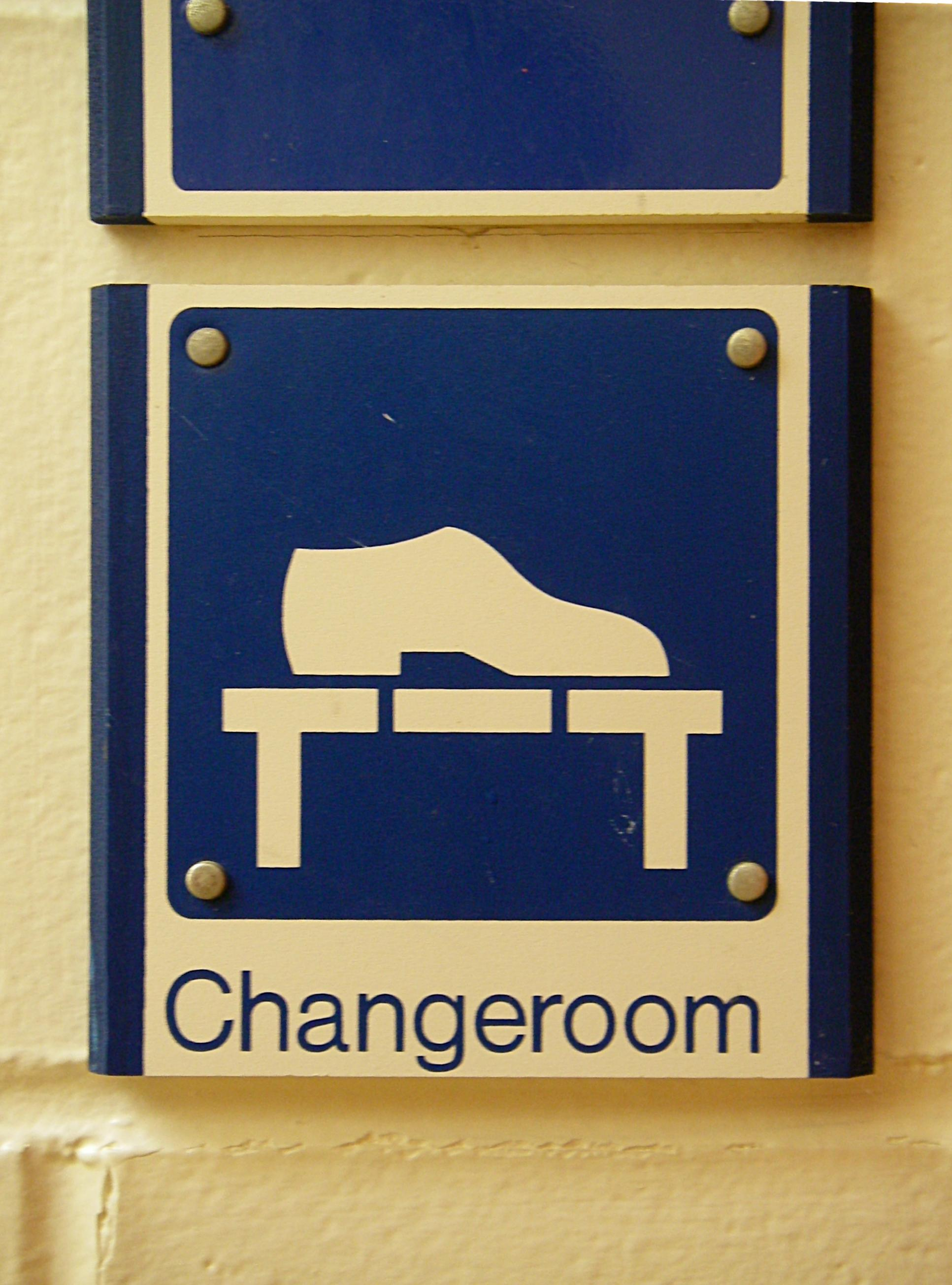
Changeroom sign

Various types of changing rooms exist:

- Changing stalls are small stalls where clothes can be changed in privacy. They are used for any physical activity.
- Locker rooms are usually gender-specific spaces where clothes are changed and stored in lockers. They are often used for swimming or other sporting purposes. They are open spaces with no stalls. These rooms include toilets, sinks, and showers.
- Fitting rooms, or dressing rooms, are usually small single-user-cubicles where a person may try on clothes. These are often found at retail stores where one would want to try on clothes before purchasing them.

=== Changing stalls ===
Changing stalls are small stalls where clothes can be changed in privacy. Clothes are usually stored in lockers. There are usually no separate areas for men and women. They are often combined with gender-separated communal showers. Most public pools have changing facilities of this kind alongside communal changing-rooms. Some other places also offer these changing stalls such as fitness centers.

=== Communal changing rooms ===
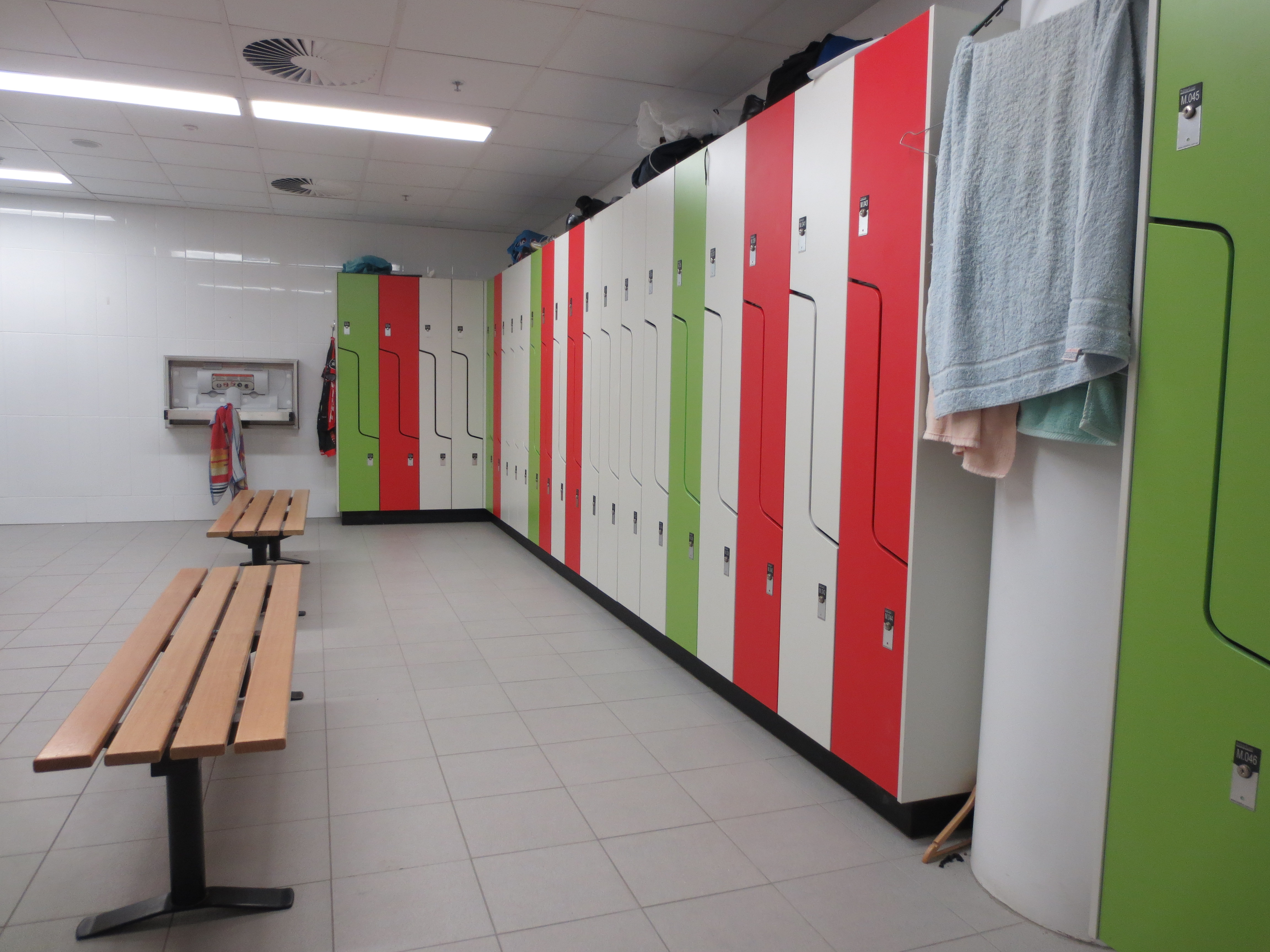
Lockers and bench in changeroom

Locker rooms are thus named because they provide lockers for the storage of one's belongings. Alternatively, they may have a locker room attendant who will keep a person's belongings until one comes to retrieve them. Locker rooms are usually open spaces where people change together, but there are separate areas, or separate locker rooms, for men and women. Sometimes they are used in swimming complexes.

Locking devices used in locker rooms have traditionally been key or coin lockers, or lockers that are secured with a combination lock. Newer locker rooms may be automated, with robotic machines to store clothes, with such features as a fingerprint scanner to enroll and for later retrieval. Locker rooms in some water parks use a microchip equipped wristband. The same wristband that unlocks the lockers can be used to purchase food and drinks and other items in the water park.

Some communal changing rooms are only supposed to be used by groups of persons, not individuals. In this case, there may be no lockers. Instead, the entire room is locked in order to protect belongings from theft.

Locker rooms are also used in many middle schools and high schools. Most of them include showers for after Physical Education.

At an outdoor sports facility, the changing rooms may be integrated into a pavilion or clubhouse, with other facilities such as seating or a bar.

=== Fitting rooms (stores) ===
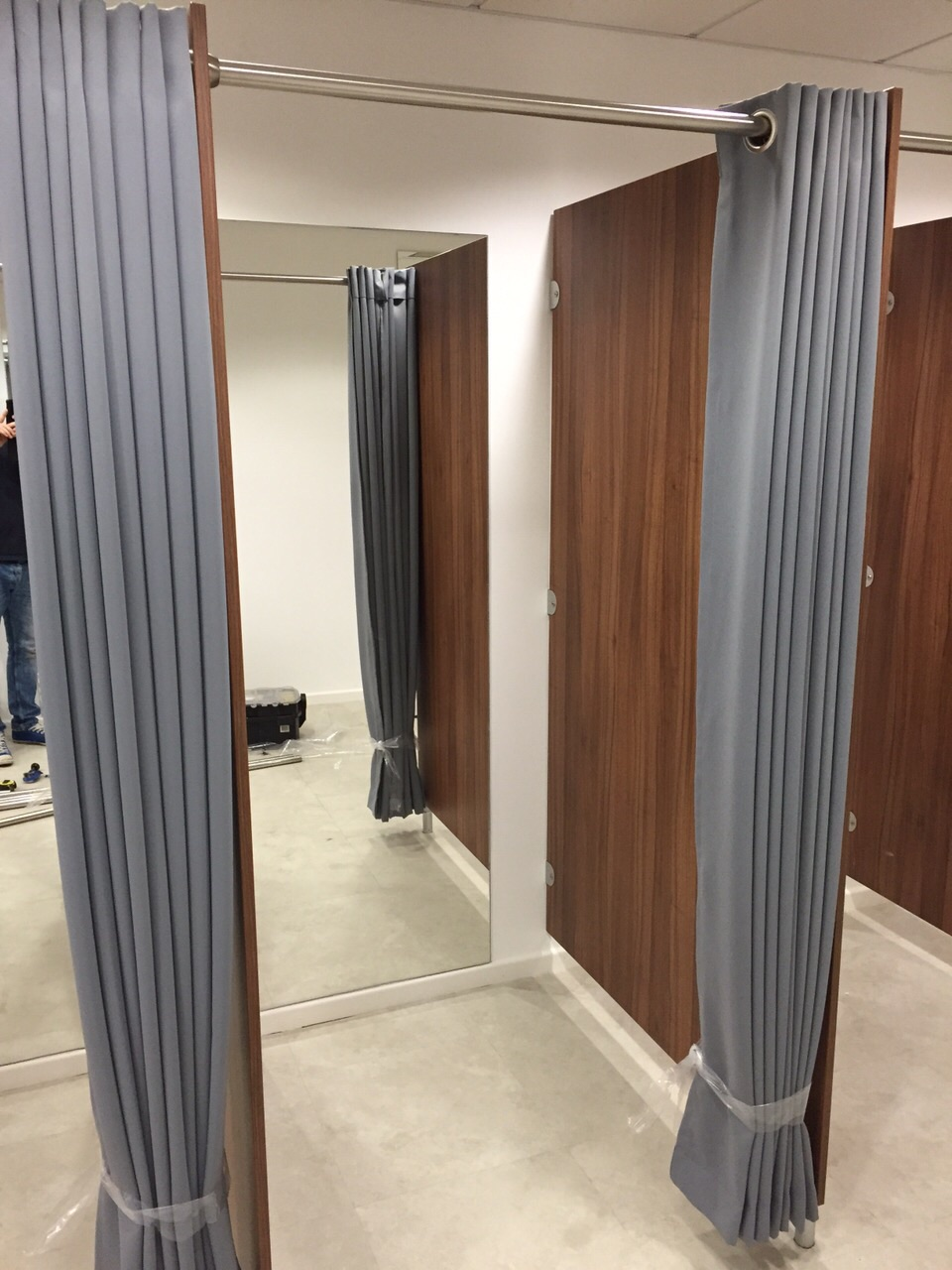
A fitting room in a department store

Fitting rooms, or dressing rooms, are rooms where people try on clothes, such as in a department store. The rooms are usually individual rooms in which a person tries on clothes to determine fit before making a purchase. People do not always use the fitting rooms to change, as to change implies to remove one set of clothes and put on another. Sometimes a person chooses to try on clothes over their clothes (such as sweaters or coats), but would still like to do this in private. Thus fitting rooms may be used for changing, or just for fitting without changing.

==== Rules and conventions ====
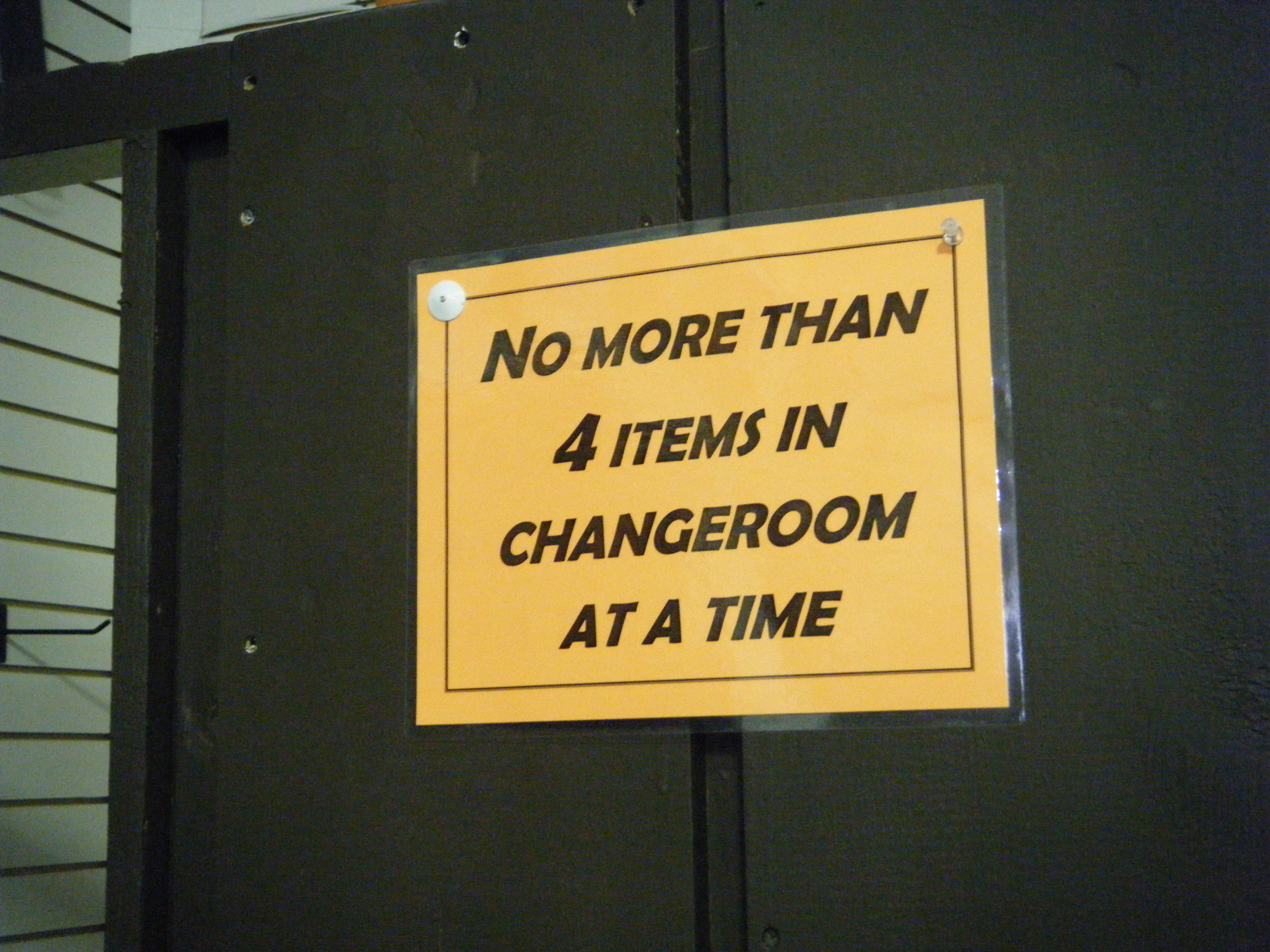
Changeroom sign in clothing store

Retail establishments often post rules such as maximum number of items allowed in changing room, e.g. "no more than 4 items allowed in changing room".

==== History ====
It appears that the first store fitting rooms appeared with the spread of department stores. Émile Zola noted their existence in his novel Au Bonheur des Dames (1883), and that they were then forbidden to men. Some years later, when Henri Gervex, who painted Jeanne Paquin in 1906, that was no longer the case.

In any case, Buster Keaton worked in one in an American 1928 silent comedy The Cameraman. Since then, they have continued to provide comic scenes in films, for example in the 1995 French film Les Trois Frères.

=== Dressing rooms (domestic) ===
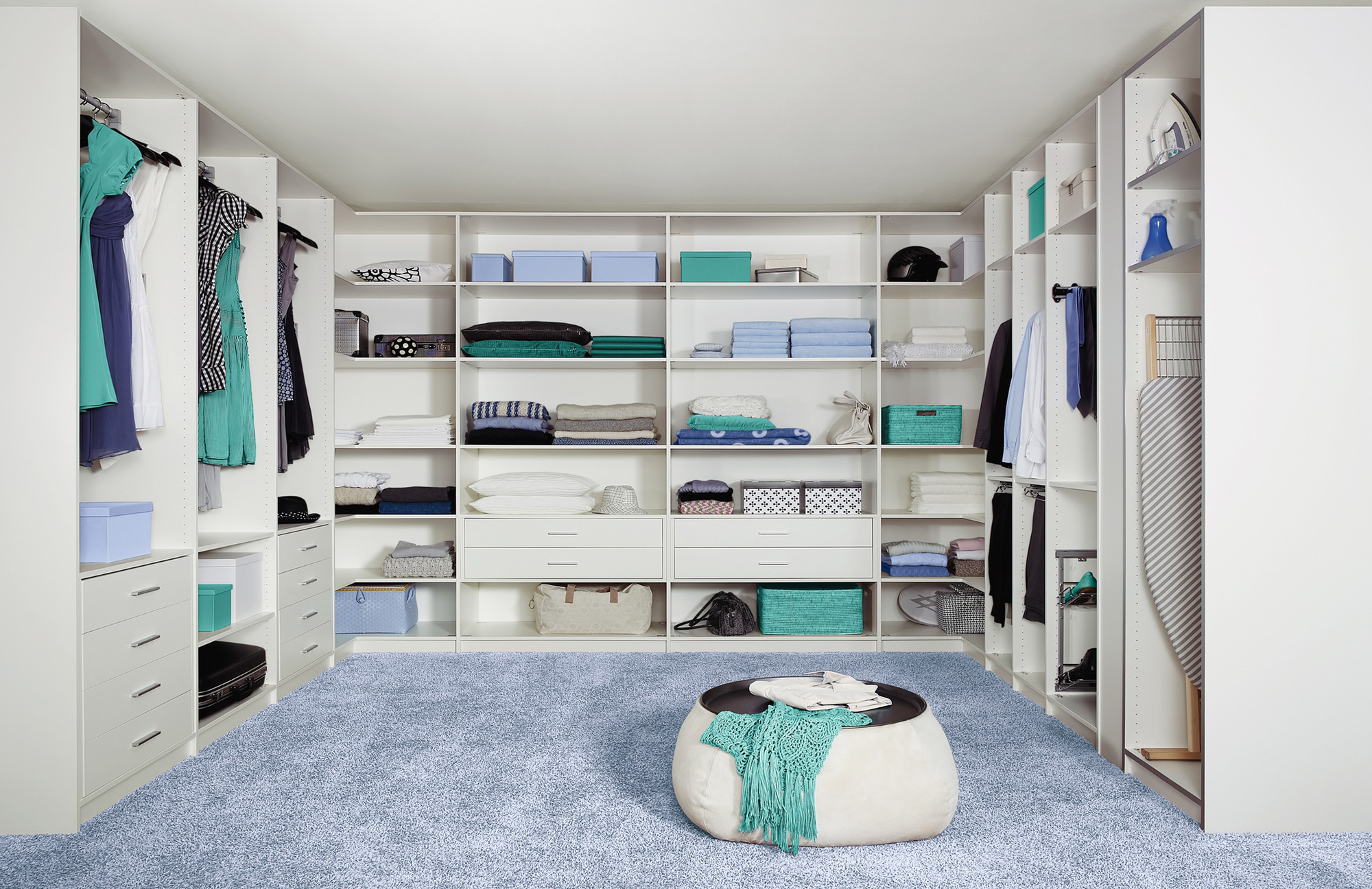
Domestic dressing room

Some homes may have dedicated rooms solely for the purpose of dressing and changing clothes, typically with fitted wardrobes. In larger Victorian houses it was common to have a private room called a boudoir for the lady of the house that is accessible from the bedroom, and also a dressing room for the gentleman (and sometimes a man's cabinet).

== Security ==
Because of the privacy afforded by changing rooms, they create a problem in the trade-off between security and privacy, where in it may be possible for crime to be perpetrated by people using the cover of privacy to sell drugs, or steal clothing from a department store. Some department stores have security cameras in the changing rooms.

Communal changing rooms pose less of a risk of theft than fitting rooms, because there is not total privacy. In particular, the perpetrator of a crime would not know whether or not other users might be undercover police or security guards. Many modern changing rooms often have labyrinth-style entrances that have no door, so that people outside cannot see in, but security can walk in at any time without the sound of an opening door alerting persons inside. Washrooms in which changing clothes is merely a secondary purpose often also have such labyrinth openings. Many washrooms have security cameras in the main area with a view of the sinks and the urinals from a viewing angle that would only show the back of a user. However, when a washroom is located near a fountain, wading pool, or the like, and is likely to be used for changing clothes, some believe that washroom surveillance cameras would be a violation of privacy.

Another security risk present is that of theft. Sometimes, no method of securing items is provided, but even lockable lockers or baskets are usually designed for only minimal security allowing experienced thieves to steal the valuable items which people typically have with them before changing. Changing room operators frequently post signs disclaiming responsibility for stolen items, which can discourage but not eliminate claims for negligence.

== See also ==
- Unisex changing rooms
- Virtual dressing room
