= Driveway =

Type of private road for local access to one or a small group of structures

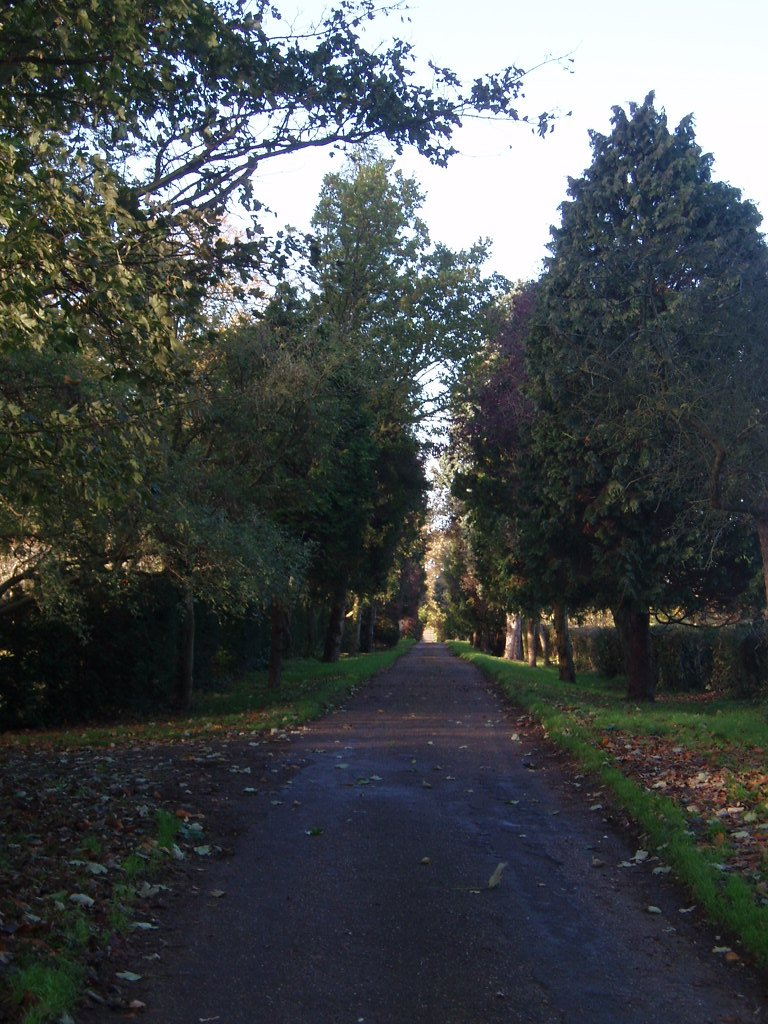
Driveway to a farm

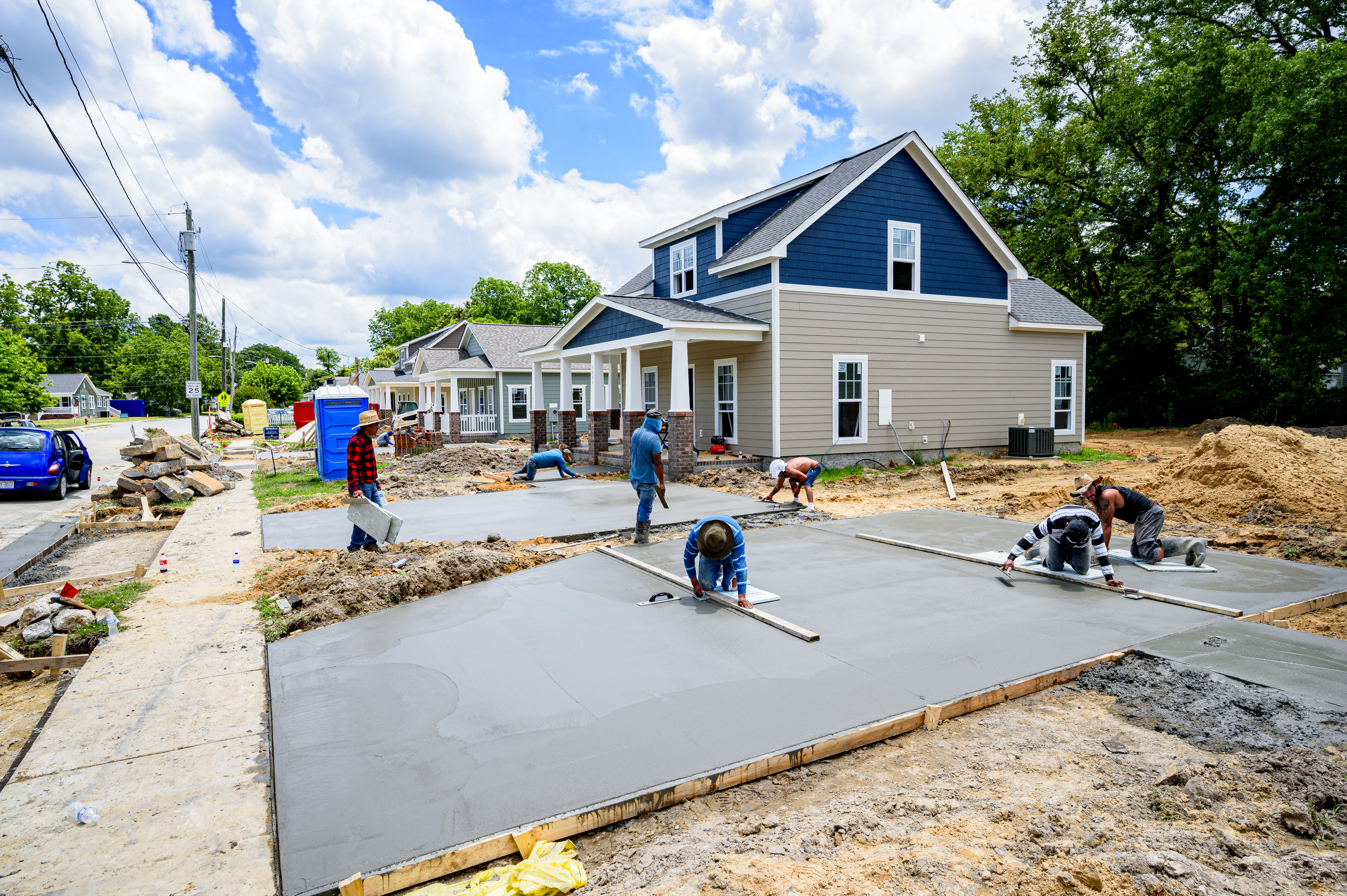
Concrete driveways under construction

A driveway (also called drive in UK English) is a private road for local access to one or a small group of structures owned and maintained by an individual or group.

Driveways rarely have traffic lights, but some may if they handle heavy traffic, especially those leading to commercial businesses or parks.

Driveways may be designed and decorated in ways that public roads cannot because of their lighter traffic and the willingness of owners to invest in their construction. Driveways are not resurfaced, cleared of snow, or maintained by governments. They are generally designed to conform to the architecture, standards, and landscaping of connected houses or other buildings.

Some materials used for driveways include concrete, decorative brick, cobblestone, block paving, asphalt, gravel, resin-bound paving, and decomposed granite. These materials may be surrounded with grass or other ground-cover plants.

Driveways are commonly used as paths to private garages, carports, or houses. On large estates, a driveway may be the road that leads to the house from the public road, possibly with a gate in between. Some driveways may be designed to serve different homeowners. A driveway may also refer to a small apron of pavement in front of a garage with a curb cut in the sidewalk, sometimes too short to accommodate a car.

Often, either by choice or to conform with local regulations, cars are parked in driveways to leave streets clear for traffic. Moreover, some jurisdictions prohibit parking or leaving standing any motor vehicle upon any residential lawn area (the property from the front of a residential house, condominium, or cooperative to the street line other than a driveway, walkway, concrete, or blacktopped surface parking space). Other examples include the city of Berkeley, California that forbids "any person to park or leave standing, or cause to be parked or left standing any vehicle upon any public street in the City for seventy-two or more consecutive hours." Other areas may prohibit leaving vehicles on residential streets during certain times (for instance, to accommodate regular street cleaning), necessitating the use of driveways.

Residential driveways may serve as the place for conducting garage sales, automobile washing and repair, and recreation, notably (in North America) for basketball practice.

== See also ==
- Access management
- Pavement (material)
- Parkway
