= Virtual mirror =

Device which displays a user's image on a screen

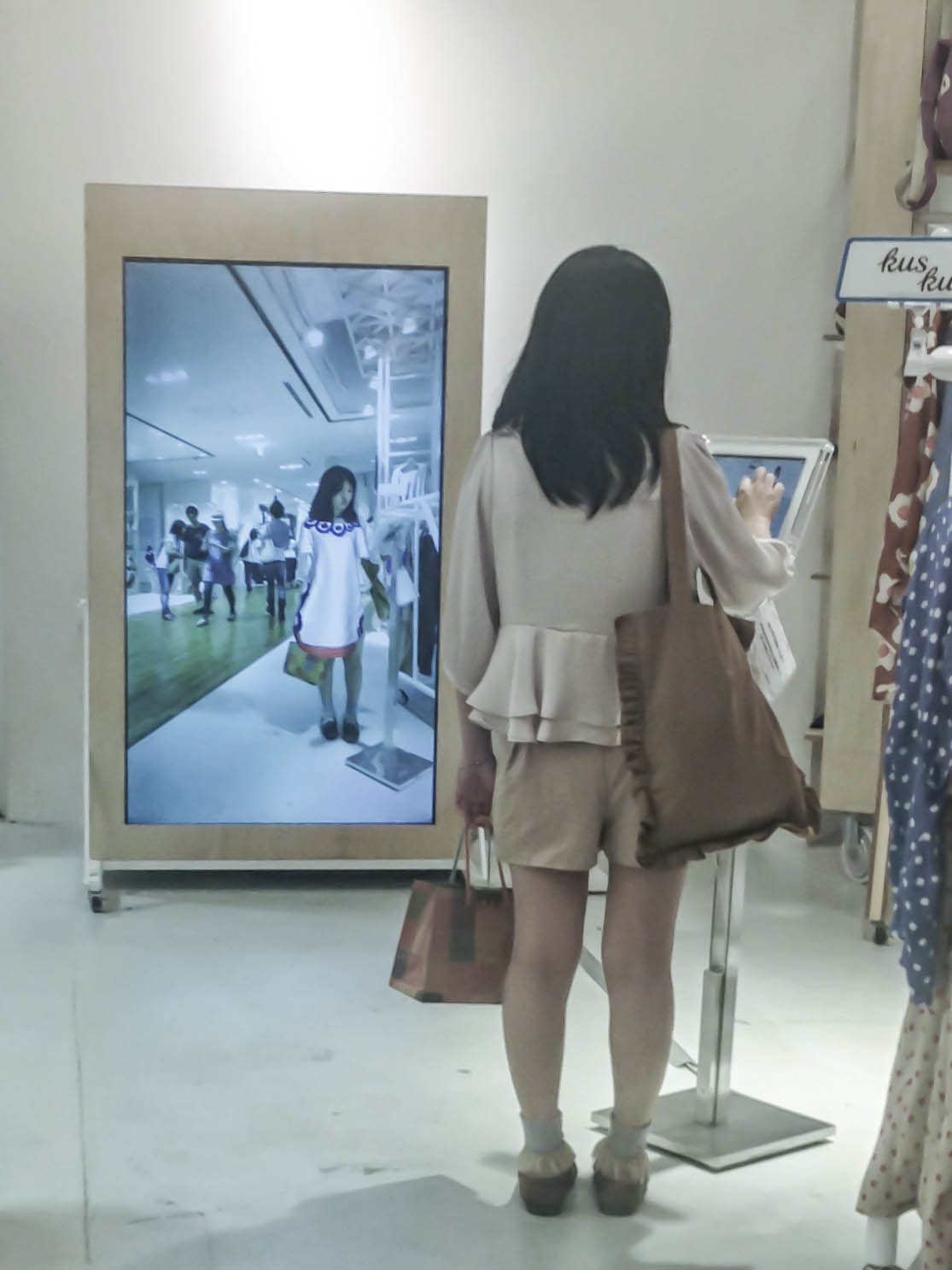
A virtual dressing room mirror

A virtual mirror or smart mirror is a device which displays a user's own image on a screen as if that screen were a mirror. Some versions feature augmented reality additions to the video display, or use an entirely virtual graphical avatar of the user.

Virtual mirrors are available as mobile phone applications, with some allowing users to modify the appearance of their hairstyle, make-up or accessories. The technology is also used in online shopping and in-store shopping to show people how an item of makeup, clothing, handbag or accessory might look on them. Some major retailers use the technology to provide virtual dressing rooms to customers. These smart devices are used to enhance in-store experience, provide product information to customers and to display marketing and promotional messaging.

A future-prediction report issued by Accenture in 2015 anticipated that the "in-store experience" on offer in future retail settings could include smart mirrors. Many color contact sites feature a similar virtual try-on environment to simulate the look a user will achieve when actually wearing the contact lenses.

== Technology ==
Virtual mirrors usually utilize computer vision, face detection and face tracking technologies to analyze visual patterns and represent digital information. The technology uses algorithms to collect, analyze and make meaningful inferences from data from one or multiple images.
