= InterContinental Hanoi Landmark 72 =

InterContinental Hanoi Landmark72

General information
- Location: Mỹ Đình, Từ Liêm District; Hanoi, Vietnam
- Coordinates: 21°1′1.03″N 105°47′2.31″E
- Opening: September 2017
- Owner: AON Vina., Ltd

Technical details
- Floor count: 10

Other information
- Number of rooms: 359
- Number of suites: 34
- Number of restaurants: 5

Website
- Official website

The InterContinental Hanoi Landmark72 is an InterContinental hotel in Hanoi. The hotel is located on the top floors of Keangnam Hanoi Landmark Tower. At 346 meters, it is the tallest hotel in Hanoi, second tallest in Vietnam and Southeast Asia.

== Location ==
InterContinental Hanoi Landmark72 is located in the center of the new West Hanoi business district, near the National Convention Center, Hanoi Museum and 45-minute drive away from the Noi Bai International Airport. Part of the Landmark72 complex, the hotel commences from the 62nd to the 71st floor of the tallest skyscraper in Hanoi, and second tallest in Vietnam.

== Facilities ==
At 346 meters height, the hotel is listed at number 9 on World's 10 highest hotel with data from Emporis.

InterContinental Hanoi Landmark72 offers 359 guest rooms including 34 suites.

The hotel has one of the largest meeting and event facilities in Hanoi, with 9 meeting rooms and 1 Grand Ballroom that can cater up to 1,000 delegates.

The hotel features five restaurants and bars all located on the 62nd floor - The Hive Lounge (lobby lounge), 3 Spoons (all-day dining restaurant), Stellar Steakhouse, Stellar Teppanyaki and Q Bar (bespoke cocktail bar).

== See also ==
- List of tallest hotels in the world
- List of tallest buildings in the world
- List of tallest residential buildings in the world
- Keangnam Hanoi Landmark Tower
