= Webcam Social Shopper =

- Developer: Zugara
- Release: 2009; 17 years ago
- Stable release: v1.1.8 / 2012
- Available in: English, Spanish, Portuguese, Dutch, Italian, German, French, Turkish, Chinese, Russian
- License: commercial software
- Website: www.webcamsocialshopper.com

The Webcam Social Shopper, often referred to as virtual dressing room software, debuted online in June 2009 and was created by Los Angeles–based software company, Zugara. Cited initially as an "augmented reality dressing room", The Webcam Social Shopper allows online shoppers to use a webcam to visualize virtual garments on themselves while shopping online. The software also uses a motion capture system that allows users to use hand motions to navigate the software while standing back from their computer. Social media integration with Facebook and Twitter also allows users of the software to send pictures of themselves with the virtual garments for immediate feedback.

Though the Webcam Social Shopper has also been called virtual fitting room or virtual dressing room software, Zugara has referred to the software as an advanced product visualization tool for retailers.

On September 25, 2012, Zugara was granted US Patent No. 8,275,590 for "Providing a simulation of wearing items such as garments and/or accessories". The patent relates to Zugara's augmented reality social commerce platform, the Webcam Social Shopper.

== Technology ==
The Webcam Social Shopper software can utilize 2-dimensional webcams or 3-dimensional or depth sensing cameras like Microsoft's Kinect.

== History ==
In November 2009, the Webcam Social Shopper was first deployed as Fashionista by online fashion site, Tobi.com. This initial version of the Webcam Social Shopper, used an augmented reality marker for placement of the virtual garment on the subject.

In February 2011, a new version of the Webcam Social Shopper was debuted publicly for the first time at the DEMO conference in Palm Springs, California. This latest version of the software removed the need for a marker and instead used facial tracking for placement of the virtual garment. Dubbed the "Plug and Play" version of the Webcam Social Shopper, this version of the software was designed for easier integration for retailers and ecommerce sites.

UK Fashion Retailer, Banana Flame, was the first retailer to integrate the Plug and Play version of the virtual dressing room software. According to Matthew Szymczyk, CEO of Zugara, the new version of the Webcam Social Shopper can be integrated by a retailer in less than a day. Banana Flame deployed the software to offer a virtual dressing room for online shoppers to "try on" the clothes virtually on Banana Flame's website.

On July 10, 2012, Zugara released an API for the Webcam Social Shopper for ecommerce platform integration. PrestaShop began offering the new Webcam Social Shopper module to its 127,000 retailers that same month.

On October 3, 2013, Zugara released a Kinect enabled version of the Webcam Social Shopper software called, "WSS For Kiosks". On December 10, 2013, PayPal debuted a mobile payments enhanced version of WSS For Kiosks at the LeWeb conference in Paris.

== Initial criticism ==
Virtual Dressing Room software, such as the Webcam Social Shopper, received early criticism for not helping users determine the fit of a virtual garment.

However, subsequent users of the software have noted its effectiveness when matching colors while trying on dresses. The company has stated that the software simulates the "at the rack" moment found in physical retail stores when shoppers hold items of clothing up to themselves.

With the growing popularity of ecommerce, The Webcam Social Shopper has also been cited as a tool for online shoppers that might potentially decrease sales at brick and mortar retailers.

== Reviews ==
TIME magazine cited the Webcam Social Shopper as one of the few useful augmented reality applications that could be advantageous to both retailers and consumers.

The New York Times also addressed the Webcam Social Shopper software in an article entitled, "Brands Embrace An Augmented Reality". In the article, a young woman used the Webcam Social Shopper software on Banana Flame's retail site and ended up buying a dress as it helped her make a purchase decision.

Major news sources such as CNN, have also profiled The Webcam Social Shopper in a segment on augmented reality.

== Results ==
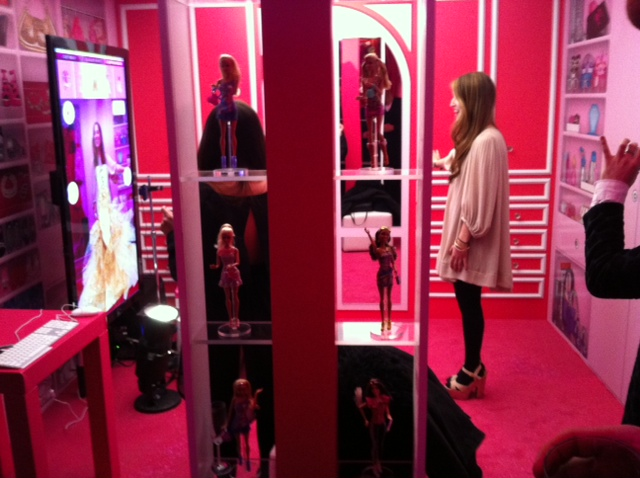
Barbie Dream Closet At New York Fashion Week 2012

Internet Retailer published a report on Virtual Fitting Rooms and Fit Simulators on February 1, 2012. Danish social shopping comparison site LazyLazy.com deployed the Webcam Social Shopper in late 2011 and saw its conversion rate immediately jump with 17% of shoppers using the software converting two to three times more than those who did not use the software.

In February 2012, the Mattel brand, Barbie, used a kiosk-enabled version of the Webcam Social Shopper for a New York Fashion Week event where attendees could try on virtual Barbie outfits. Data released by Zugara, showed that the web version of the Barbie Dream Closet software showed increased usage over a 3-month period. From February 2012 to April 2012 use of the software increased from 20% to 33% and 50% of those users took an average of 6 photos each.
