= Trung Hòa - Nhân Chính =

Borough in Hanoi, Vietnam

Trung Hòa - Nhân Chính is an urban development area in southwestern Hanoi, the capital of Vietnam.

The borough comprises the Trung Hoà ward of Cầu Giấy District and Nhân Chính ward of Thanh Xuân District. According to the Đô thị e-magazine, the borough was Hanoi's most desirable urban area in 2008.

== Location & significant buildings ==
Trung Hòa - Nhân Chính is a centre of important headquarters, banks and enterprises. The area features mother roads of the city which link to Hoà Lạc high-tech park and former area of Hà Tây (now is part of Hanoi) in the south.

Various significant buildings are listed in this area, which include:

- Landmark 72 – Vietnam's second highest building
- 34T Apartment Tower – The first highest building in Vietnam from the area
- MobiFone headquarter
- Vietnam National Convention Center
- Big C Thang Long – Hanoi's largest retail hypermarket
- Thanh Xuân gymnasium
- Hanoi – Amsterdam High School

== Financial centers ==
A variety of banks and security companies have been being opened in Trung Hoà–Nhân Chính, which includes:

- Asia Commercial Bank
- Bank for Investment and Development of Vietnam
- VP Bank
- Agribank
- Techcombank
- Habubank
- Vietcombank
- GP Bank
- PG Bank
- Military Bank
- Mekong Housing Bank

== Major roads ==
- Phạm Hùng Boulevard – links central Thanh Xuân district to western Cầu Giấy district
- Tran Duy Hung Boulevard – links western Đống Đa District to the western Thanh Xuân district
- Le Van Luong Boulevard (lengthened continuation of Lang Ha Avenue) – links central Đống Đa District to Hà Đông
- Khuat Duy Tien Boulevard – links the central to the western parts of Thanh Xuân District
- Thang Long Boulevard –, links central South West to the Hòa Lạc hi-tech park
