= Vendor on premises =

A Vendor on Premises (VOP) is defined as on site coordination of a customer's temporary help services through an exclusive, long-term general contractor relationship with a temporary help company. The designated VOP may enter subcontracting relationships with other temporary help suppliers, or relationships may be specified by the customer.

== See also ==
- Contingent workforce
- Vendor management system
- Managed service provider
- Employment agency
- Human resource management
- Professional employer organization (PEO)
