= Virtual dressing room =

Online equivalent of in-store changing room

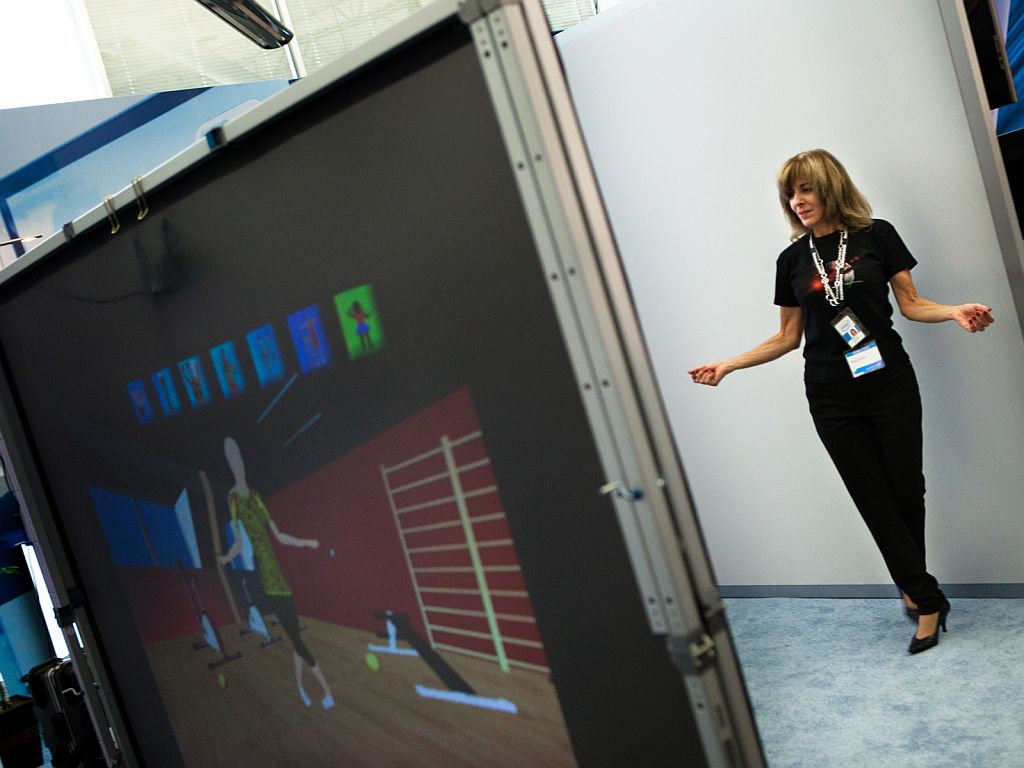
An Intel labs researcher demonstrating an augmented reality dressing room

A virtual dressing room (also often referred to as virtual fitting room and virtual changing room although they do, on examination, perform different functions) is the online equivalent of an in-store changing room.

Having begun to emerge from 2005, fit technologies started to be widely reported from 2010, but are now available from an increasing variety of providers and are in use by a growing number of prominent retailers in their webstores.

A fit technology may be categorised according to the problem that it resolves (size, fit or styling) or according to the technological approach. There are many different types of technological approach.

== Size recommendation services ==
Some recommendation systems use existing garments to recommend a size, while others use measurements taken by the customer. Recommendation systems have been developed for products beyond garments, such as ring sizers. Examples of these recommendation systems include Find My Ring Size. Others still take a combination of both measurements and existing garments (aka biometric sizing) and yet others add in style preference-related questions.

Those that take existing measurements either do this from their own brand goods, or use databases of design measurements of supplier garments.

== Body scanners ==
Body scanner technologies come in two distinct flavours: scanners that use technologies such as webcams, phone cameras, or Microsoft’s Kinect device; and scanners that use more sophisticated technologies requiring the shopper to travel to the scanner.

Web and phone camera technologies require users to stand a fixed distance away from the camera and to hold a standard-sized object (such as a CD) that the camera can use as a reference for size.

The more sophisticated scanners that use laser or millimetre wave detector technology, or multiple arrays of Kinect sensors, are too bulky and expensive to be used in most stores and are located instead in shopping malls or in large department stores. Customers are required to visit the location to be scanned and this information may then be used on online sites.

Body scanner fit technologies have existed since at least 2005, when the Intellifit system, used by Levi’s was introduced. Unique Solutions purchased Intellifit in 2009, and in October 2011 re-branded as Me-ality. They are also used in creating custom made apparel such as the body scan jeans by Weekday.

== 3D solutions ==
3D fitting rooms use computer-generated 3D images to create an experience similar to that seen in virtual world computer games. These solutions generate a virtual mannequin (avatar) using customer body measurements and shape information.

An avatar of the shopper is created, which requires shoppers to measure themselves and provide these data. Sometimes the avatar may be personalised: racially, or by skin tone, or by application of pre-determined hair-styles, or even by uploading an image of a customer’s own face. The avatar may then be used to show how the shopper would look wearing the clothing, accessories and any other items on sale.

More sophisticated versions allow side-by-side comparison of different versions of a garment, and enable different items to be tried on at the same time.

== Fitting room with real 3D simulation ==
Real 3D Simulation fitting room combines the features of 3D solutions and photo-accurate fitting rooms. Using both photo and simple body measurements, the solution generates a 3D mannequin, which accurately visualizes the customer in chosen apparel items. Normally, the system suggests an appropriate size for entered measurements, but customer can also choose other sizes to estimate their fit.

== Dress-up mannequins/mix-and-match ==
In this variant, clothes and accessories are photographed on real-life mannequins. The mannequins are then edited out digitally from the images and replaced with a virtual mannequin designed to reflect the brand in question. A shopper may then drag and drop (and mix-and-match) clothes on the virtual mannequin. Some such solutions are being used to replace the real-life models in the garment photography, reducing the cost associated with human models and standardising the photography processes.

== Photo-accurate virtual fitting room ==
This technology is a convergence of two techniques: using real models and dress-up mannequins. Instead of photographing garments on people similar to customer’s shape and size, images are made using shape-shifting, robotic mannequins. The computer-controlled mannequins quickly morph through a series of body shapes and sizes while garments – in each different size – are photographed and the image stored in a database together with the measurements that generate the image. Since the mannequins are computer-controlled, the whole process is relatively fast.

In the final version, the mannequin is edited out from the photography and replaced with a virtual avatar, which can be changed to reflect the brand involved.

nce a customer inputs their measurements into the system, the correct set of images – those images in which the mannequin has the same measurements as the shopper – is retrieved from the database and shown to the shopper.

== Augmented reality ==
Most augmented reality virtual dressing room solutions work by superimposing the 3D model or picture of a garment or accessory within the live video feed of the customer. The superimposed 3D model or picture of the garment or accessory will then track to movements of the customer so it appears as if the customer is wearing the virtual item in the video view. Augmented reality virtual dressing rooms usually require a desktop webcam, a smartphone camera or 3D camera such as Kinect to function. Examples include Zugara's Webcam Social Shopper.

Another example of augmented reality utilized for virtual dressing rooms includes use of a 3D camera to manipulate areas of a garment or accessory within a display.

== Real models ==
Two variants of this exist, with the first of them now common in many online stores. The product information lists the attributes of the model that is pictured wearing the garments, and details the size of the garment in question.

Some businesses have gone further, and provide garment images on multiple models in a variety of sizes. Shoppers may watch a video of each model and interactively manipulate the model on the screen, either to walk or turn around, thereby getting a realistic view of what the garment will look like on a real person.

== Other related technology ==
Other novelty attempts at creating a virtual dressing room solution included an interactive mirror that personalises the real world shopping experience using virtual technology. Paxar, a subdivision of Avery Dennison, introduced the RFID mirror in 2007. A shopper wearing clothing with an RFID tag standing in front of the RFID mirror was automatically greeted by the mirror with various pieces of information about the garment, including material and color selections available. The mirror also offered accessory options and suggested different pieces that could be worn together for fashion coordination.

Image interactivity technology is used in virtual fitting rooms to give shoppers visual feedback and improve their experience.

Another approach displays a personalized fit score beneath each item as the shopper browses online. Size n Fit, a Singapore-based company, has launched this product which displays personalized fit score by asking simple question as to what fits you well and comparing it with the one you are trying to buy.
