= Vendor management system =

Business software

A vendor management system (VMS) is an Internet-enabled, often Web-based application that acts as a mechanism for business to manage and procure staffing services – temporary, and, in some cases, permanent placement services – as well as outside contract or contingent labor. Typical features of a VMS application include order distribution, consolidated billing and significant enhancements in reporting capability that outperforms manual systems and processes.

In the financial industry due to recent regulations (see FRB SR13-19; OCC 2013-29 and CFPB 2012-03), vendor management implies consistent risk classification and due diligence to manage third-party risk. A number of institutions have re-classified or renamed their programs to Third Party Risk Management (TPRM) to align with the verbiage used by the regulatory agencies.

== Definitions ==
The contingent workforce is a provisional group of workers who work for an organization on a non-permanent basis, also known as freelancers, independent professionals, temporary contract workers, independent contractors or consultants. VMS is a type of contingent workforce management. There are several other terms associated with VMS which are all relevant to the contingent workforce, or staffing industry.

A vendor is a person or organization that vends or sells contingent labor. Specifically a vendor can be an independent consultant, a consulting company, or staffing company (who can also be called a supplier – because they supply the labor or expertise rather than selling it directly).

A VOP, or Vendor On Premises, is a vendor that sets up shop on the client's premises. They are concerned with filling the labor needs and requirements of the client. The VOP does this either by sourcing labor directly from themselves or from other suppliers with whom they may be competing. Also, the VOP manages and coordinates this labor for the client.

A MSP, or Managed Service Provider, manages vendors and measure their effectiveness in recruiting according to the client's standards and requirements. MSPs generally do not recruit directly, but try to find the best suppliers of vendors according to the client's requirements. This, in essence, makes the MSP more neutral than a VOP in finding talent because they themselves do not provide the labor.,

VMS is a tool, specifically a computer program, that distributes job requirements to staffing companies, recruiters, consulting companies, and other vendors (i.e. Independent consultants). It facilitates the interview and hire process, as well as labor time collection approval and payment.

A CSM, or Contracted Service Management System, is a tool which interfaces with the Access Control Systems of large refineries, plants, and manufacturing facilities and the ERP system in order to capture the real-time hours/data between contractors and client. This type of system will typically involve a collaborative effort between the contractor and facility owner to simplify the timekeeping process and improve project cost visibility.

An EOR, or Employer of Record, is designed to facilitate all components of independent contractor management, including classification, auditing, and compliance reviews. Employer of Records help drive down the risk of co-employment and allow enterprises to engage and manage independent contractors without the stress of government audits or tax liabilities.

== History and Evolution of VMS ==
VMS (Vendor Management System) is a fairly recent advancement in managing contingent labor spend. VMS is an evolution of the Master Service Provider (MSP) / Vendor-On-Premises (VOP) concept, which became more prevalent in the late-1980s to the mid-1990s when larger enterprises began looking for ways to reduce outsourcing costs. An MSP or VOP was essentially a master vendor who is responsible for on-site management of their customer's temporary help / contract worker needs. In keeping with the BPO (Business Process Outsourcing) concept, the master vendor enters into subcontractor agreements with approved staffing agencies.

It is noteworthy that VMS began to modernize around the time Michael Hammer and James Champy's Reengineering the Corporation became a bestseller. Large enterprises were looking for ways to compete in an increasingly global economy. The main advantage for U.S. businesses during this time was their purchasing departments, which were able to channel new contract personnel requisitions to one source (the VOP) and, in turn, reduce procurement costs by simplifying and streamlining their payment process. In effect, U.S. companies only had to write one check to one vendor vis-à-vis hundreds of suppliers.

With the Internet came new ways of doing business, which included electronic payment. The emergence of eBusiness, B2B, E-Procurement et al. was the catalyst that began the VMS industry. As businesses began to integrate this e-business concept, online auctions began to appear. The value proposition was, they claimed, that they could reduce spend for purchasing office suppliers, industrial suppliers and other commodities by putting these purchase requests out for bid via an online auction.

== The Pioneers ==
In 1993, one such company recognized the contingent labor spend management niche as an immense opportunity – Geometric Results Inc. (GRI). At its origin, GRI was a wholly owned Ford Motor Company subsidiary and it was GRI who developed one of the first significant VMS applications in the industry, PeopleNet. Originally starting out as a manual process, some system automation was introduced in 1995. A year later, PeopleNet became an automated VMS system. Overall, GRI managed nearly $200 million in spend at Ford. In 1997, MSX International purchased GRI and continued its growth in the marketplace offering a vendor neutral VMS for automotive industry.

MSXI later launched a new proprietary Internet software - b2bBuyer, and the program continued to grow with the expansion of MSXI's European operations. Their success is achieved through best in class processes and technology supported by a vendor neutral model. MSXI also created a 51/49 minority-owned subsidiary and repackaged its web-based application as “TechCentral” to service former GM parts supplier, Delphi Corporation. Today, The Bartech Group—a minority-owned staffing supplier and new MSP—assumed the Delphi VMS in 2006 and currently runs the program using the Fieldglass VMS platform.

During the same time, ProcureStaff Technologies also launched a vendor neutral VMS solution for human capital management in 1996. ProcureStaff Technologies spun off as a subsidiary of its parent company, Volt Information Sciences to address the glaring need for vendor neutrality in the procurement of this commodity. ProcureStaff Technologies implemented a vendor-neutral model for its first client, a global telecommunications company, because it promoted competition by opening requisitions up to a larger number of pre-qualified staffing suppliers without bias or favoritism. The benefits realized to the customer included reduced cycle times and lower overall contingent labor spend.

It was not long after this time that other companies, eager to capitalize on the expanding marketplace, entered the fray. Although Chimes was a wholly owned subsidiary of Computer Horizons Corp., the key differentiator between it and other VMS providers that were emerging was that it positioned itself as a “vendor-neutral” provider of Business Process Outsourcing (BPO) services instead of just a technology company that licensed its VMS software. Chimes value proposition was it would create and staff a Program Office (PO) that integrated with the customer's business Purchasing, HR, and Accounting processes. That is, Chimes realized that simply licensing its software to its customers was a strategy that could not guarantee a successful implementation and realization of the benefits of the VMS concept.

In February 2007, Axium International purchased Chimes, Inc. from its parent company (CHC) and merged it with Ensemble Workforce Solutions. The companies together form ECG (Ensemble Chimes Global), the largest VMS provider in the world. Fiscal improprieties led to the unexpected implosion of Chimes (ECG) and its parent company Axium in early 2008. In January 2008, Axium International Inc., the parent of the Ensemble Chimes Global, filed for Chapter 7 bankruptcy in Los Angeles and both Axium International and Ensemble Chimes Global ceased operations. On January 24, 2008, Beeline, the workforce solutions business unit of MPS Group, Inc., announced that it was the successful bidder for the assets of Chimes.

The Aberdeen Group, an independent research organization, found that less than 17% of companies who have implemented a program to manage their contingent labor workforce have seen an improvement in spend and source-to-cycle performance metrics. This supports Chimes contention that the best implementations are those that include an emphasis on improving business processes versus just selling a tool to a customer.

== Benefits to U.S. Businesses ==
By 2002, there were over 50 VMS solution providers. The software was now web-based, so stakeholders – customer hiring managers, VMS program office staff, and suppliers – could access the system from the internet. Typical benefits included:

- Streamlined requisition approval workflow
- Reduced time-to-fill cycle times
- Simplified vendor management
- Bill rate standardization / management
- Optimization of supplier base
- Consolidated invoicing
- Improved security and asset management
- Availability of vendor performance metrics
- Visibility and cost control over maverick spend
- 10-20% reduction in contingent labor spend

== VMS Trends ==
=== Rapid Growth and Maturity ===
According to Aberdeen research, 72% of US companies have a single program for managing contract labor and professional services sourcing and procurement.

Although the industry is still in the latter phase of the growth stage, vendors should be aware of the symptoms that indicate the arrival of the industry decline, such as when: A) competitive pressures force MSP/VMS margins to weaken; B) there is a rash of competitor consolidation via merger, acquisition or abandonment; C) sales expansion within the existing customer base is dramatically reduced; and D) sales volume to new customers in the US decline.

Once customers have realized the initial benefits of gaining control and managing their contingent labor workforce, there will be efforts towards continuous improvement—to include cost reductions as well as analysis of what other indirect spend categories can be expanded. Opportunities for VMS providers include project-based spend, independent contractors, and professional services, among others.

=== Increase Scrutiny in Vendors ===
In United States, agencies such as Consumer Financial Protection Bureau (CFBP), Federal Financial Institution Examination Council (FFIEC) and Federal Reserve Board (FRB) are becoming more involved in assessing regulatory compliance of financial institution. The increased focus means that organizations are relooking into how they select their vendors.

=== Emphasis on measuring CyberRisk ===
A quick analysis of data breaches and exposures since 2014 indicates that breaches has become more frequent and bigger scale than ever. With much more data generated and stored on cloud, malicious actors are interested to exploit systems that are wrongly configured. Hackers gain access to data by exploiting vendor's security loopholes. One challenge in measuring vendor's cyber risk is that the conventional way of measuring a vendor via questionnaire is dated and not comprehensive enough.

== See also ==
- Contingent workforce
- Professional employer organization
- Human resources
- Human resource management
- Contingent labor
- Contractor management
- IT cost transparency
