= MobiFone =

Vietnamese mobile network operator

MobiFone Corporation
- Trade name: MobiFone
- Native name: Tổng công ty Viễn Thông MobiFone
- Formerly: Vietnam Mobile Telecom Services Company
- Type: State-owned enterprise
- Industry: Mobile Telecommunications
- Founded: 16 April 1993; 33 years ago
- Headquarters: Hanoi, Vietnam
- Area served: Nationwide
- Key people: Tô Mạnh Cường
- Products: Mobile networks, Telecom services
- Brands: MobiFone
- Revenue: 40.8 Trillion VND (around $2bn)
- Operating income: 6.6 trillion VND (around $330m)
- Number of employees: approx. 3000
- Parent: Ministry of Public Security (from 2 February 2025)
- Website: www.mobifone.vn

MobiFone Corporation (less formally MobiFone; Vietnamese: Tổng công ty Viễn Thông MobiFone, lit. 'MobiFone Telecommunications Corporation') is a Vietnamese mobile network operator headquartered in Trung Hoà–Nhân Chính, Hanoi. Founded on 16 April 1993, as a Global System for Mobile Communications launcher, MobiFone is the second largest telecommunications provider in Vietnam (2023).

== Market share and competitors ==
MobiFone held a market share of 22.52% in 2023. Its main competitors included Viettel with 57.6%, VinaPhone with 17.49%, and Vietnamobile with 1.75%. MobiFone, along with VinaPhone and Viettel, the three state-owned providers, held a combined market share of almost 98%.
