= Mỹ Đình =

Coordinates: 10°00′N 105°58′E

Mỹ Đình is a geographical name for an area now consisting of Từ Liêm ward (Mỹ Đình 1 and Mỹ Đình 2 before merging) in the Nam Từ Liêm district of Hanoi, Vietnam. Prior to 2014, it was a commune (xã) in Từ Liêm District, about 10 kilometres (6.2 mi) northwest of central Hanoi, Vietnam. The area can be described as a middle class suburb with a population that includes many expatriate teachers who work in the local schools.

== Sports ==
The area has grown rapidly ever since the 40,192-seat Mỹ Đình National Stadium opened in 2003. The stadium is home to Vietnam's national football team—playing host to international friendly matches—as well as Viettel F.C. (previously known as Thể Công), a football club founded by the Vietnam People's Army. The stadium hosted the 2003 Southeast Asian Games and the 2009 Asian Indoor Games.

== Education ==
Mỹ Đình is becoming an education centre of Hanoi. High schools in the area are The Vietnam-Australia School, Japanese School of Hanoi, Đoàn Thị Điểm School and Le Quy Don Primary School. The Vietnam National University is constructing buildings in the area. Mỹ Đình was formerly home to the Hanoi-Korean school which has since relocated.

== Economy ==
The Garden Shopping Mall opened in Mỹ Đình in 2010. Star Fitness opened a gym there in late 2010. A Platinum Cineplex movie complex opened in January 2011. Crowne Plaza opened a hotel in the area that will service the nearby stadium and convention centre.
