= Landmark 72 =

Supertall skyscraper in Hanoi, Vietnam

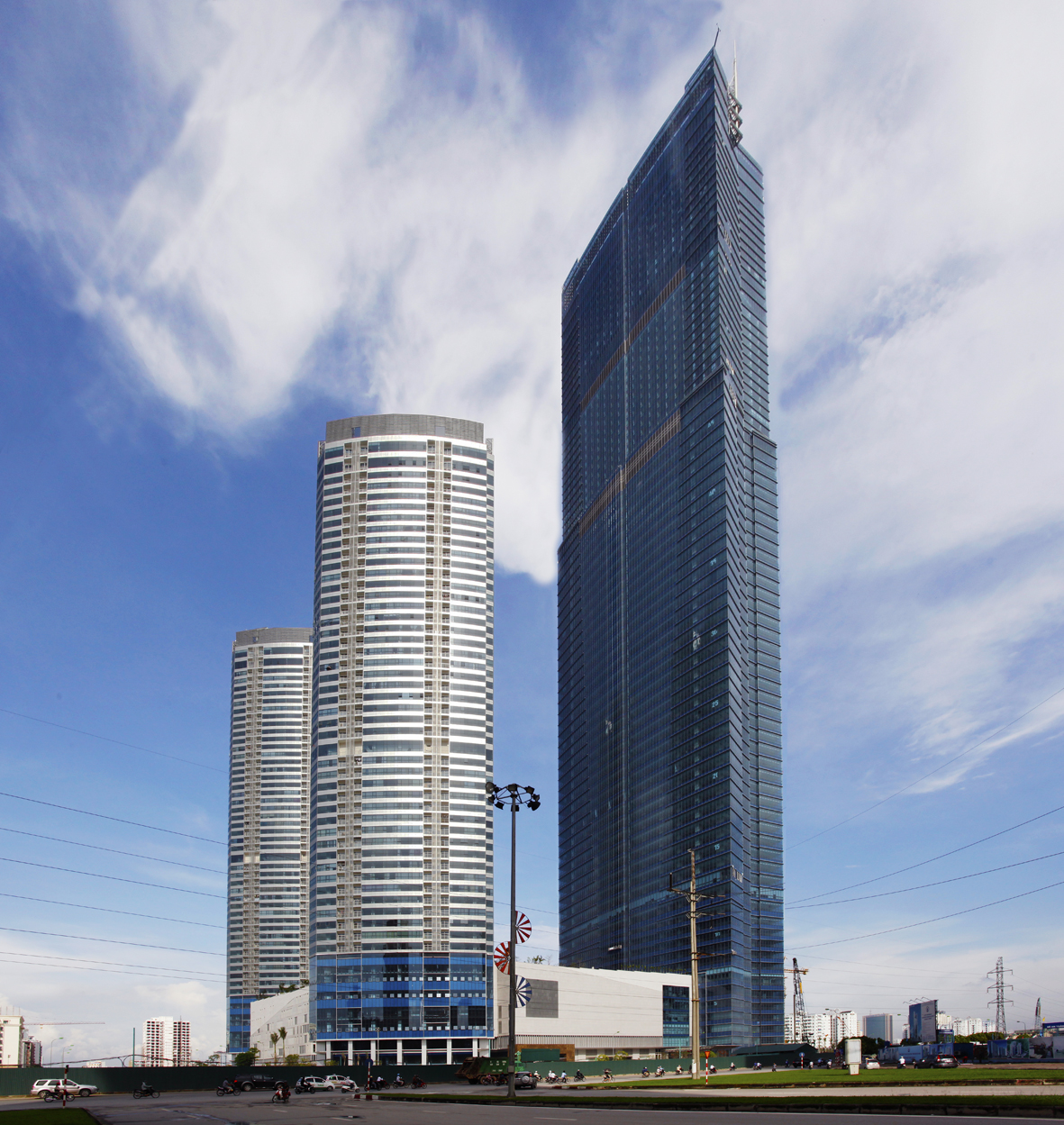
- Former names: Keangnam Hanoi Landmark
- Alternative names: AON Hanoi Landmark

Record height
- Tallest in Vietnam from 2011 to 2018^{[I]}
- Preceded by: Bitexco Financial Tower
- Surpassed by: Landmark 81

General information
- Status: Completed
- Type: Landmark 72: Mixed-use (convention, hotel, serviced apartment and office); Twin Towers: Residential; 5-story Podium: Retail
- Location: Trung Hòa - Nhân Chính, Plot E6 Phạm Hùng Road, Yên Hòa, Hanoi, Vietnam
- Coordinates: 21.017324°N 105.784054°E
- Construction started: 27 August 2007
- Opened: 28 October 2011
- Cost: 1.05 billion USD
- Owner: AON Holdings; Ministry of Health; Ministry of Foreign Affairs; Ministry of Finance; Ministry of Information and Communications; Ministry of Planning and Investment; National Traffic Safety Commission; State Bank of Vietnam

Height
- Antenna spire: 350 m (1,150 ft)
- Roof: 345 m (1,132 ft)
- Top floor: 336 m (1,102 ft)

Technical details
- Floor count: 72 (and 2 underground)
- Floor area: 609,673 m^{2} (6,562,470 sq ft)

Design and construction
- Architects: Heerim, Samoo, Aum & Lee, HOK
- Developer: Keangnam Enterprises

Website
- Landmark 72

References
- "Landmark 72". SkyscraperPage.

Landmark 72 or Keangnam Hanoi Landmark Tower is a mixed-use supertall skyscraper in Trung Hòa - Nhân Chính (Cầu Giấy New Town), Phạm Hùng road, Nam Từ Liêm district, Hanoi, Vietnam. The complex consists of one 72-story mixed-use tower with a height of 350 m and 48-story twin apartment towers. Landmark 72 is located on an area of 46,054 m^{2} and the total floor area is 609,673 m^{2}, ranked 5th as the largest floor area of a single building in the world. The investor and operator of the complex is the South Korean-based company Keangnam Enterprises, Ltd. The investment capital is estimated at US$1.05 billion.

The complex features a 5-star InterContinental Hanoi Landmark 72 Hotel, offices, entertainment areas, retail spaces, clinics and convention centres. The complex opened on 18 May 2012. Keangnam Enterprises indirectly owned a 70-per cent stake in Landmark 72. The company invested over US$ 1 billion with US$ 510 million borrowed from banks.

Landmark 72 is the site of Vietnam's tallest stair climbing race, the Vietnam Landmark 72 Hanoi Vertical Run. On 30 September 2012, runners competed for the first time to be the fastest to ascend the tower's 1,914 steps.

== History ==
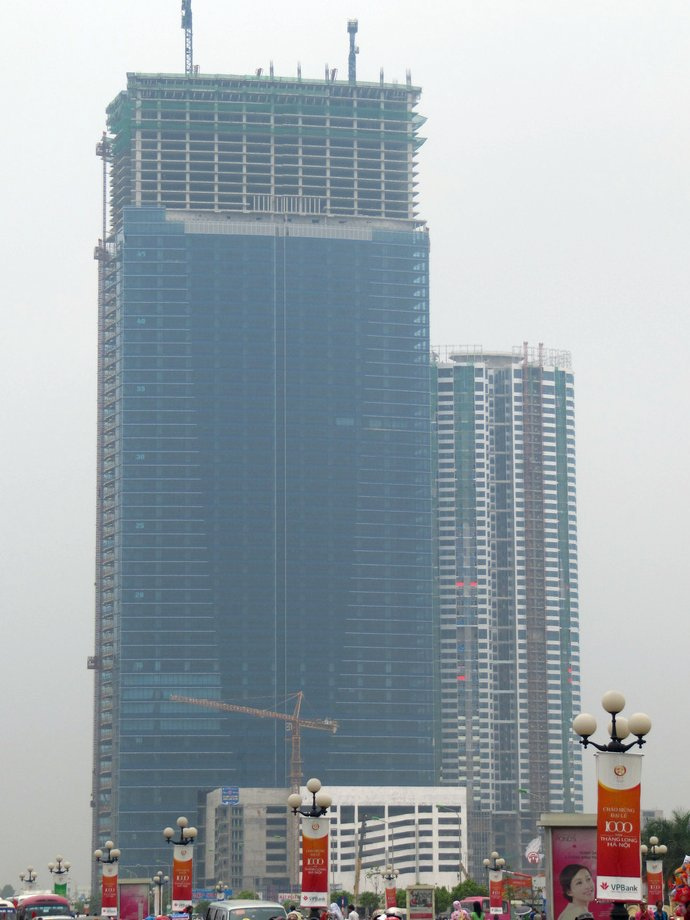
The complex under construction in October 2010

On 11 June 2008, an agreement was signed between the building owner and the InterContinental Hotels Group to operate the 359-room hotel under InterContinental Hanoi Landmark 72 with 9 hotel floors from the 62nd floor to 70th floor (Hotel Club Lounge located on the 71st Floor).

In November 2010, the main tower reached approximately 300 metres, making it the tallest building and structure in Vietnam. On 24 January 2011, the main tower topped out at 350 metres; it beat the Bitexco Financial Tower, which was opened four months before, to become the tallest building in Vietnam while the residential twin towers had topped out months before with the height of 212 metres with 48 floor counted. The complex opened on 18 May 2012. The building held the status of the tallest building in Vietnam until Landmark 81 was completed in 2018.

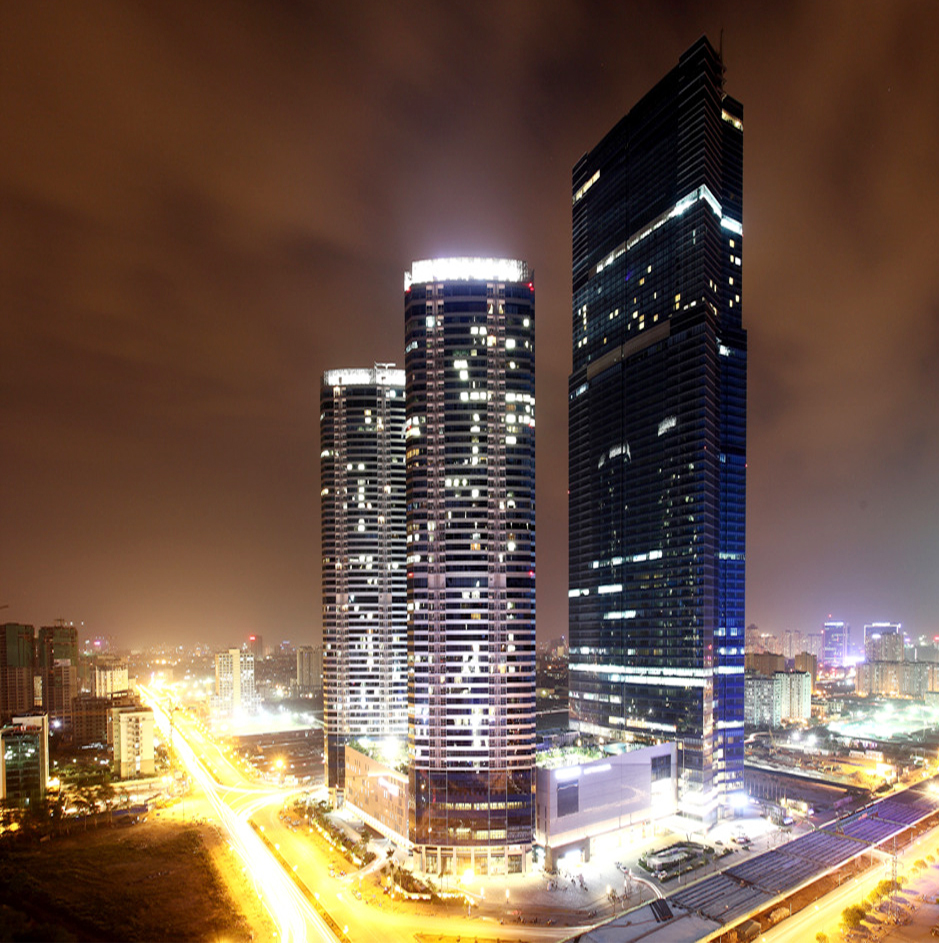
The complex at night

A Vietnamese court valued the complex at US$ 770 million in May 2015 and AON Holdings from South Korea would take over the bank loan by paying US$ 373.4 million to become the majority owner.

In early 2017, it emerged that a bribery scheme related to a proposed sale of Landmark 72 building complex in 2014 led to the arrest and charge of former UN Secretary-General Ban Ki-moon's nephew and charge of Ban's brother, Ban Ki-sang, an executive of South Korean firm Keangnam Enterprises Co Ltd. In 2013, Keangnam was facing a liquidity crisis and intended to refinance or sell the complex. When the deal eventually fell through, Keangnam entered into court receivership in South Korea. Also, Malcolm Albert Harris, a self proclaimed New York City fashion designer who pled guilty to stealing US$500,000 as part of a phony negotiation to sell Landmark 72 to a Qatari royal.

== Facilities ==
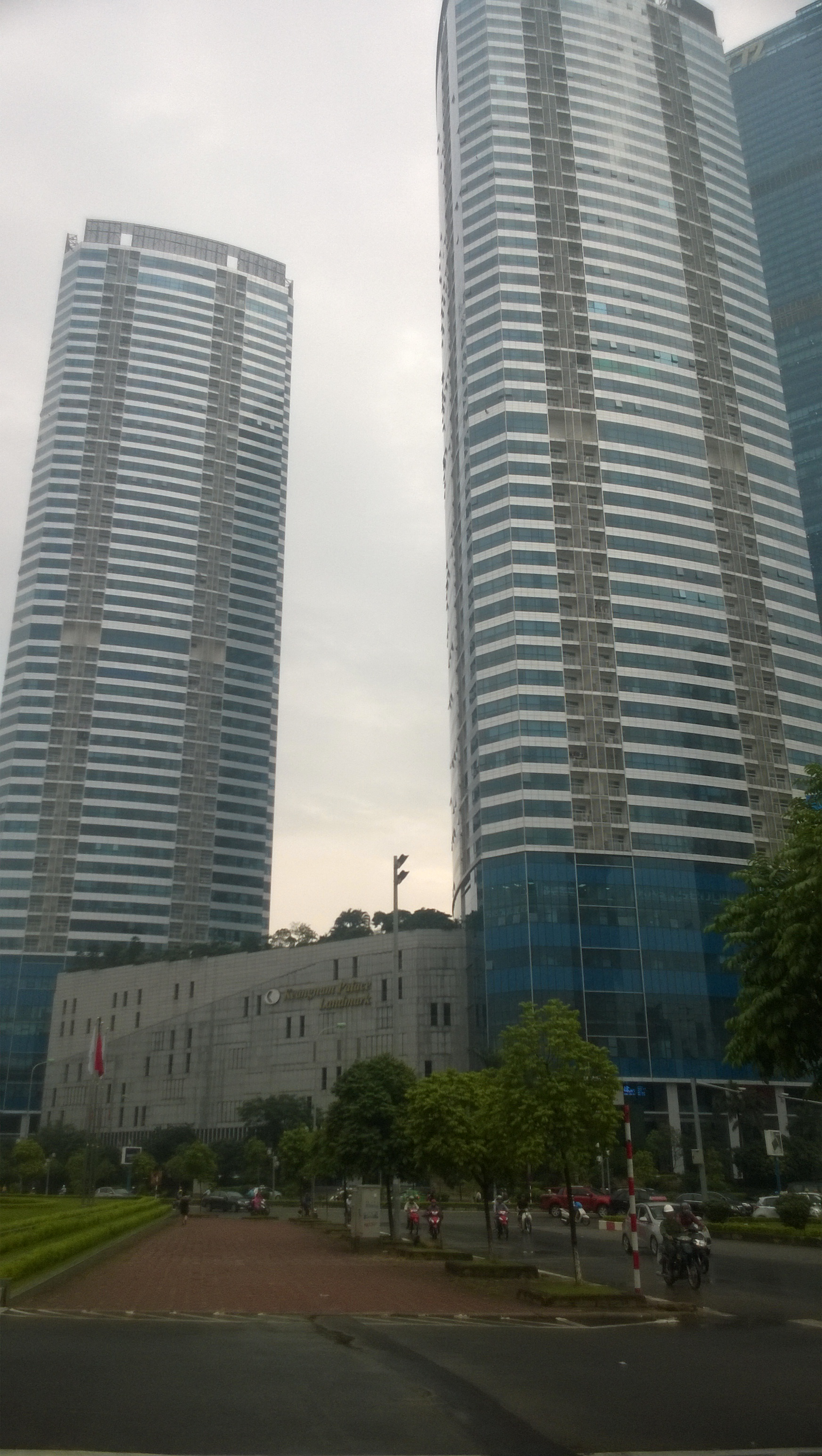
Keangnam Palace Landmark Apartment

=== Key features ===
- Keangnam Palace Landmark

Keangnam Palace Landmark is the 48-story twin towers apartment, including 922 flat units spans from Floor 6 to 48, 5-story podium is for retail.

- Landmark 72 Plaza

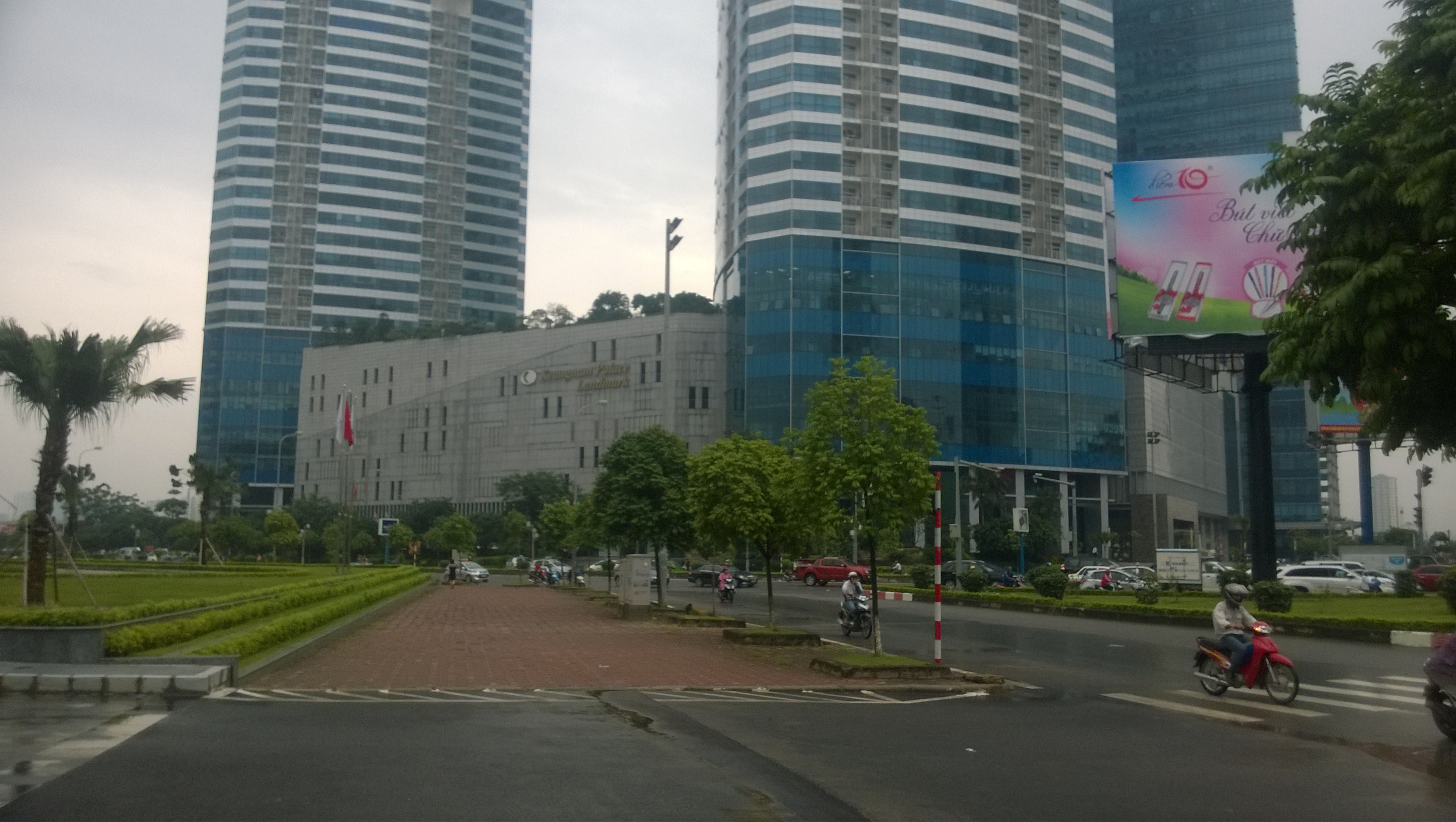
Corner of Landmark 72 Plaza

The retail area of the whole building, currently known as Landmark 72 Plaza, including the 5-storey podium of the whole complex and the from the first to the 11th floor of the Landmark 72 Tower (Floor 5 and 7 are specially for Meeting room and spa with fitness center area, respectively). It was onced operated by Parkson as a departmment store, named as Parkson Landmark 72 Hanoi and featured a Lotte Cinema from 2011 to the first days of 2015, when Parkson abruptly closed the store.

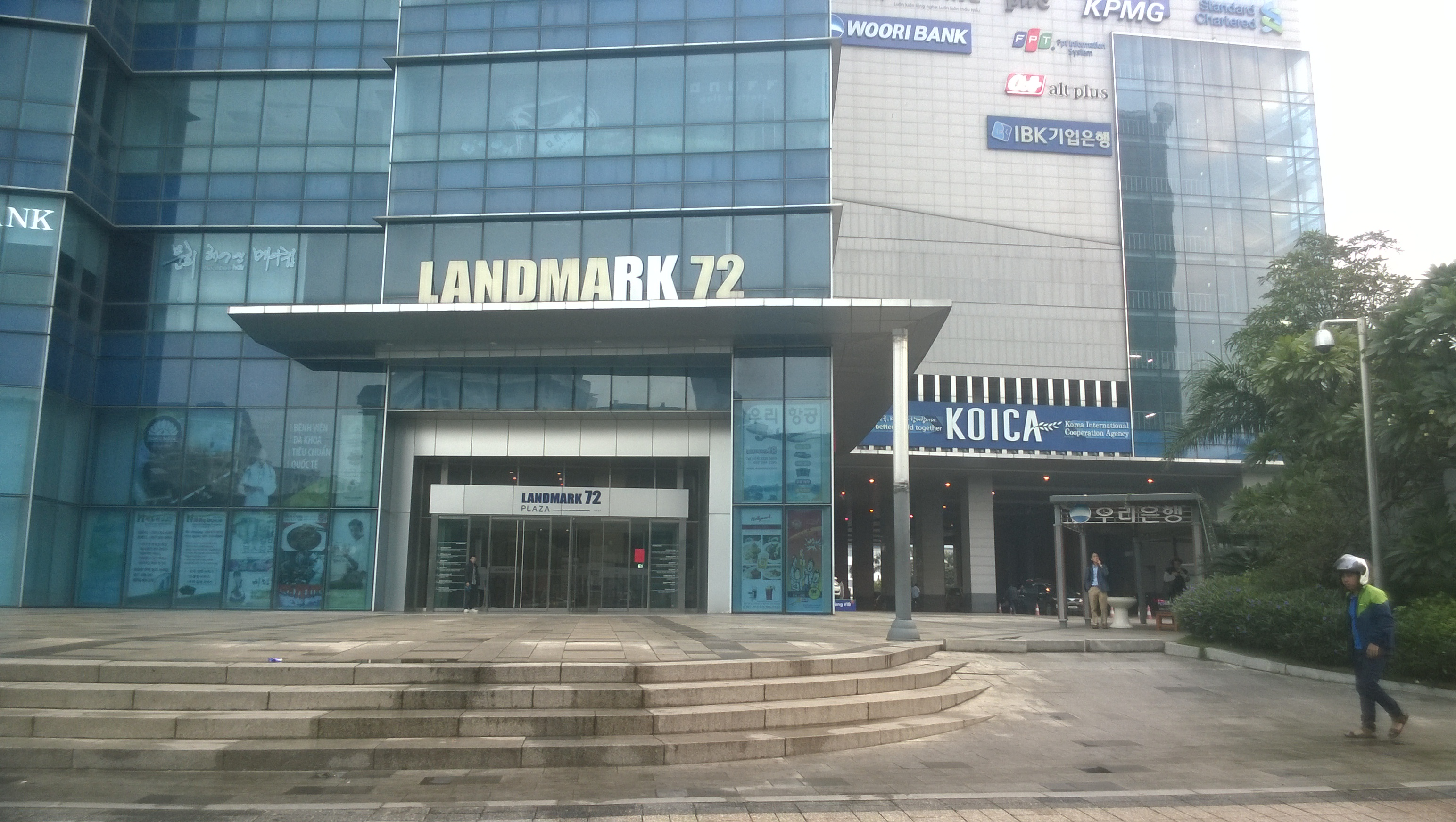
Entrance of the Landmark 72 Towe

- Helipad

All three towers have helipad on its roof.

- Calidas Gardium

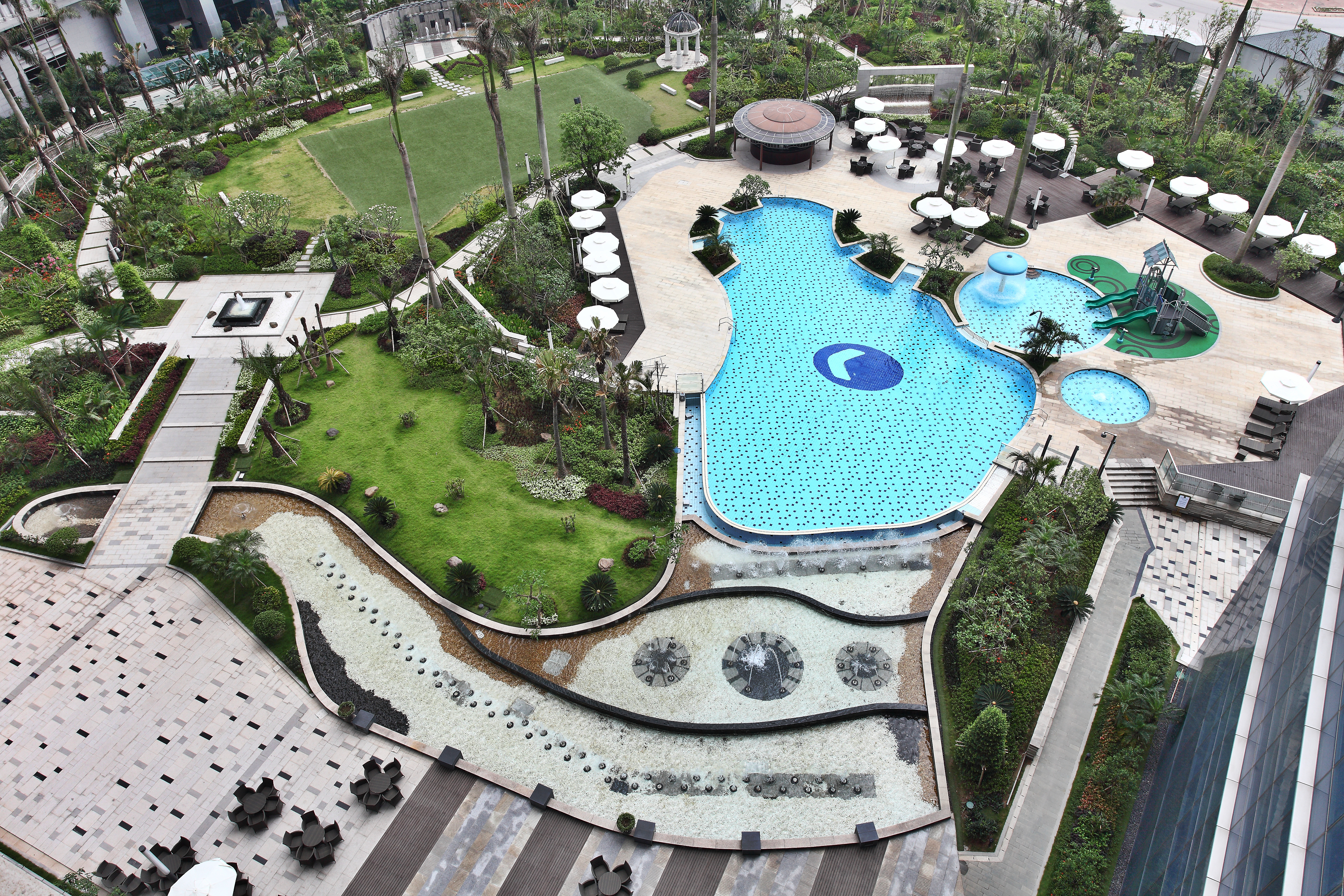
Calidas Gardium

Located at the ground floor and outdoor, include a sprawling swimming pool, an inviting pool bar, and the Calidas Gardium event garden. It has the capacity to accommodate over 1,000 people, making it suitable for hosting large-scale events such as family gatherings, weddings, birthday parties, or corporate events, and cultural festivals.

- Sky 72 Observatory

Sky 72 Observatory includes: Binocular Observatory + Living Museum + 3D and 5D Cinema, take photos and post at the 3D Trick Art Museum, ticket costs around $10.

Wish Wall service: Observators can write personal messages, thoughts, and dreams, and have them preserved on each colorful brick of the Wish Wall at the observation deck.

However, the observatory is reported that it was temporary permanently closed.

=== Floor plan ===
The following is the breakdown of the Landmark 72 Tower floors.

Floor	Use	Tenants and notes
72	Sky 72 Observatory	
71	InterContinental Hanoi Landmark 72	In-house guests gym room
70	InterContinental Hanoi Landmark 72	Hotel Club Lounge
64–69	InterContinental Hanoi Landmark 72	
62	InterContinental Hanoi Landmark 72	Hotel Lobby, The Hive Lounge, Q Bar and Restaurants: 3 Spoons, Stellar Steakhouse, Stellar Teppanyaki
48–60	Calidas Landmark72 Royal Residence Hanoi	
47	Mechanical	
12–46	Office	
10–11	Landmark 72 Plaza	International Organization for Migration, Hồng Ngọc Clinic
9	Landmark 72 Plaza	Huawei Canteen, Biwon Restaurant
8	Landmark 72 Plaza	Yeun Kyung Restaurant, The Snow Vietnam, Lotteria Restaurant,
7	Landmark 72 Plaza	Swimming Pool, Fitness Centre, Yoga & Zumba Classes, Table Tennis, Indoor Mini Golf, Sauna & Hot Tub
6	Landmark 72 Plaza	Greensum Freer The Art, DW Partner Golf, Chungdam Hanoi English Center, Ecoding Academy, BM Music Academy, Pilates Academy, Taewondo Academy
5	Landmark 72 Plaza	Meeting Room of InterContinental Hanoi Landmark 72
3–4	Landmark 72 Plaza	Sejong Vina Academy, K-Medical, K study Academy, MegaStudyese Academy, GT Global Academy, Elitopia Academy, Elijuni Academy, Synapse Academy
2	Landmark 72 Plaza	Maro259 Restaurant, Bornga Keangnam, Manna Bean Restaurant, Phở 100 - Gingseng Phở, Dinh Vietnamese Restaurant, Quafé, Hoolala Chicken & Pastanara
1	Landmark 72 Plaza	Woori Bank, Shinhan Bank, Chungdam Kindergarten, Revi Coffee & Tea, Starbucks, Tous les Jours, Pizza 4P's, Juice House & Kafé, Barunson Plus, Carvia Flower Shop, Moonhee Hair Salon, K-Market, Jins Healthy Life, Onnuri Phamarcy
B1–B2	Parking	Hồng Ngọc Clinic

== See also ==
- List of tallest buildings in the world
- List of tallest residential buildings in the world
- List of tallest hotels in the world
- InterContinental Hanoi Landmark 72

== Notes ==
^{I} Landmark 81 structurally topped out in January 2018 at 400 metres.

Records
Preceded by Bitexco Financial Tower	Tallest Building in Vietnam; 2011 – 2018; 350 m	Succeeded by Landmark 81
Preceded by Keangnam Hanoi Landmark Tower 2,3	Tallest Building in Hanoi; 2011—Present; 350 m	Succeeded by None
