= Access management =

Regulation system of roadway access

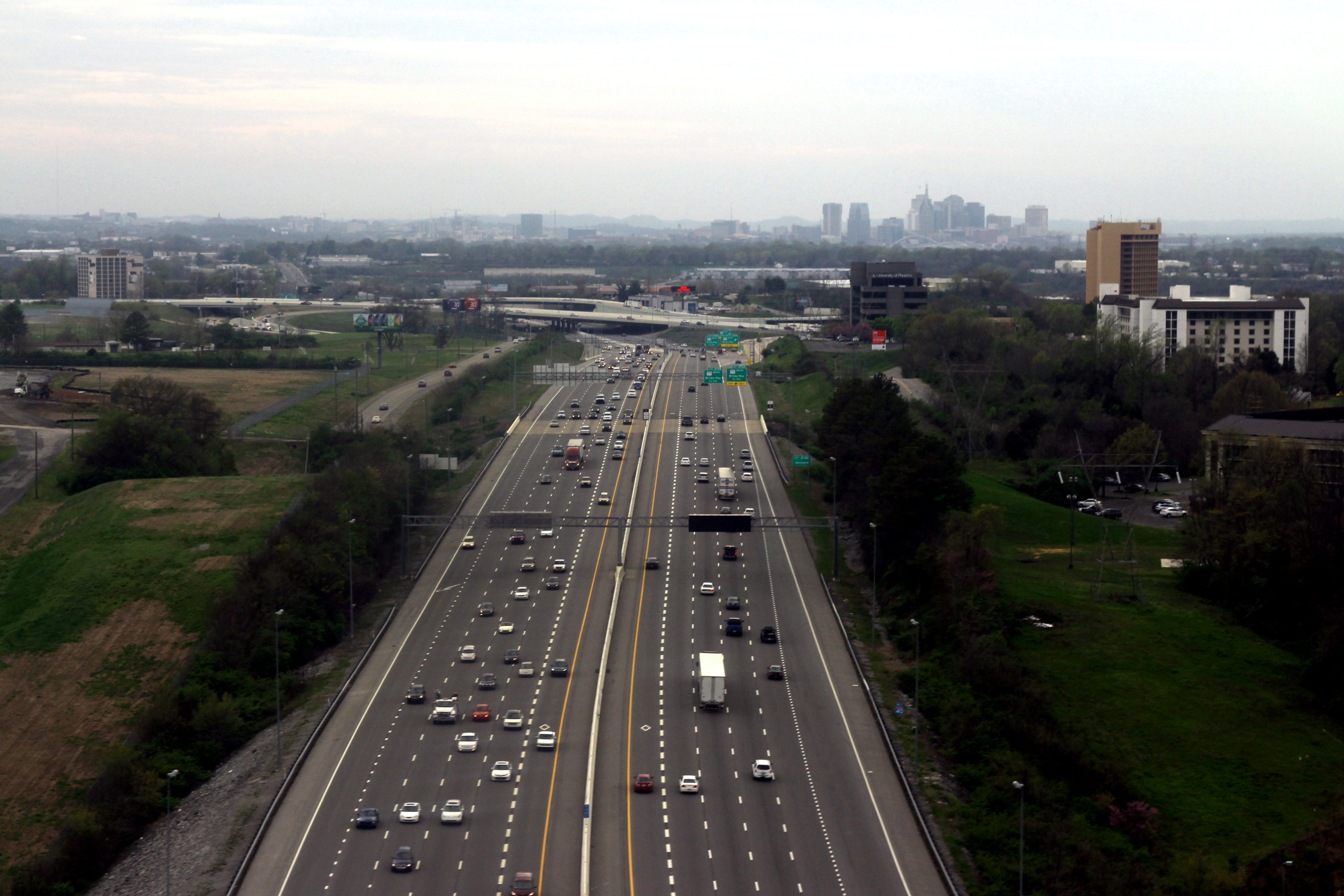
Interstate 40 in Nashville, Tennessee is a controlled-access highway managed by right-of-way fencing and other access management protocol

Access management, also known as access control, when used in the context of traffic and traffic engineering, generally refers to the regulation of interchanges, intersections, driveways and median openings to a roadway. Its objectives are to enable access to land uses while maintaining roadway safety and mobility through controlling access location, design, spacing and operation. This is particularly important for major roadways intended to provide efficient service to through-traffic movements.

Access management is most evident on freeways (UK term motorways) where access is grade separated and all movements are via dedicated ramps. It is very important on arterial roads where at-grade intersections and private driveways greatly increase the number of conflicts involving vehicles, cyclists, and pedestrians. It is also important on minor roadways for safety considerations such as driver sight distance.

Planners, engineers, architects, developers, elected officials, citizens and attorneys all play a significant role in access management. Businesses frequently view any attempt to limit access to their land uses as economically detrimental. This can make implementation controversial. However, there is evidence showing that access management can have the positive effect of increasing market area through reducing travel times on major roadways, and that minor increases in circuitry do not cause customers to stop patronizing businesses.

The most authoritative North American reference on the subject is the Access Management Manual (2014) and the Access Management Application Guidelines (2017) published by the Transportation Research Board of the National Academy of Sciences.

Colorado was the first state to enact legislation in 1979 and to adopt an associated code of practice and regulatory framework. Since that time, transportation agency interest in access management has grown significantly.

== Strategies of access management ==
Access management programs seek to limit and consolidate access along major roadways, while promoting a supporting street system and unified access and circulation systems for development. The result is a roadway that functions safely and efficiently for its useful life, and a more attractive corridor. The goals of access management are accomplished by applying the following strategies and techniques:

1. Provide a Specialized Roadway System: Different types of roadways serve different functions. It is important to design and manage roadways according to the primary functions that they are expected to serve.

2. Limit Direct Access to Major Roadways: Roadways that serve higher volumes of regional through traffic need more access control to preserve their traffic function. Frequent and direct property access is more compatible with the function of local and collector roadways.

3. Promote Intersection Hierarchy: An efficient transportation network provides appropriate transitions from one classification of roadway to another. For example, freeways connect to arterials through an interchange that is designed for the transition. Extending this concept to other roadways results in a series of intersection types that range from the junction of two major arterial roadways, to a residential driveway connecting to a local street.

4. Locate Signals to Favor Through Movements: Long, uniform spacing of intersections and signals on major roadways enhances the ability to coordinate signals and to ensure continuous movement of traffic at the desired speed. Failure to carefully locate access connections or median openings that later become signalized, can cause substantial increases in arterial travel times. In addition, poor signal placement may lead to delays that cannot be overcome by computerized signal timing systems.

5. Preserve the Functional Area of Intersections and Interchanges: The functional area of an intersection or interchange is the area that is critical to its safe and efficient operation. This is the area where motorists are responding to the intersection or interchange, decelerating, and maneuvering into the appropriate lane to stop or complete a turn. Access connections too close to intersections or interchange ramps can cause serious traffic conflicts that result in crashes and congestion.

6. Limit the Number of Conflict Points: Drivers make more mistakes and are more likely to have collisions when they are presented with the complex driving situations created by numerous conflict points. Conversely, simplifying the driving task contributes to improved traffic operations and fewer collisions. A less complex driving environment is accomplished by limiting the number and type of conflicts between vehicles, vehicles and pedestrians, and vehicles and bicyclists.

7. Separate Conflict Areas: Drivers need sufficient time to address one set of potential conflicts before facing another. The necessary spacing between conflict areas increases as travel speed increases, to provide drivers adequate perception and reaction time. Separating conflict areas helps to simplify the driving task and contributes to improved traffic operations and safety.

8. Remove Turning Vehicles from Through Traffic Lanes: Turning lanes allow drivers to decelerate gradually out of the through lane and wait in a protected area for an opportunity to complete a turn. This reduces the severity and duration of conflict between turning vehicles and through traffic and improves the safety and efficiency of roadway intersections.

9. Use Nontraversable Medians to Manage Left-Turn Movements: Medians channel turning movements on major roadways to controlled locations. Research has shown that the majority of access-related crashes involve left turns. Therefore, nontraversable medians and other techniques that minimize left turns or reduce the driver workload can be especially effective in improving roadway safety.

10. Provide a Supporting Street and Circulation System: Well-planned communities provide a supporting network of local and collector streets to accommodate development, as well as unified property access and circulation systems. Interconnected street and circulation systems support alternative modes of transportation and provide alternative routes for bicyclists, pedestrians, and drivers. Alternatively, commercial strip development with separate driveways for each business forces even short trips onto arterial roadways, thereby reducing safety and impeding mobility.

11. Transforming Road Access with Smart Technology:

- Modern road and traffic access management can incorporate technologies such as digital credentials, automated gates, vehicle identification systems, barriers, and electronic access control to regulate movement at designated entry and exit points. These technologies are used in parking facilities, business parks, residential communities, industrial sites, campuses, toll facilities, and other areas where vehicle access needs to be controlled.
- Access permissions can be determined by factors such as vehicle identity, user authorization, location, and specified time periods. Integration with visitor management and facility management systems can provide additional information about authorized visitors, contractors, and vehicles entering or leaving a controlled area. Such systems can complement conventional traffic management measures by providing controlled access at specific points while supporting the organized movement of vehicles and pedestrians.
- Electronic access control forms part of modern approaches to managing controlled entry points. Depending on the application, these systems may use digital credentials, vehicle identification, automated gates, and barriers to regulate vehicle and pedestrian movement. Technologies for these applications are offered by various access control solution providers, like Johnson Controls, Honeywell, IDCUBE, and Dormakaba.
