= Hotel Landmark Canton =

Hotel in Guangzhou, Guangdong, China

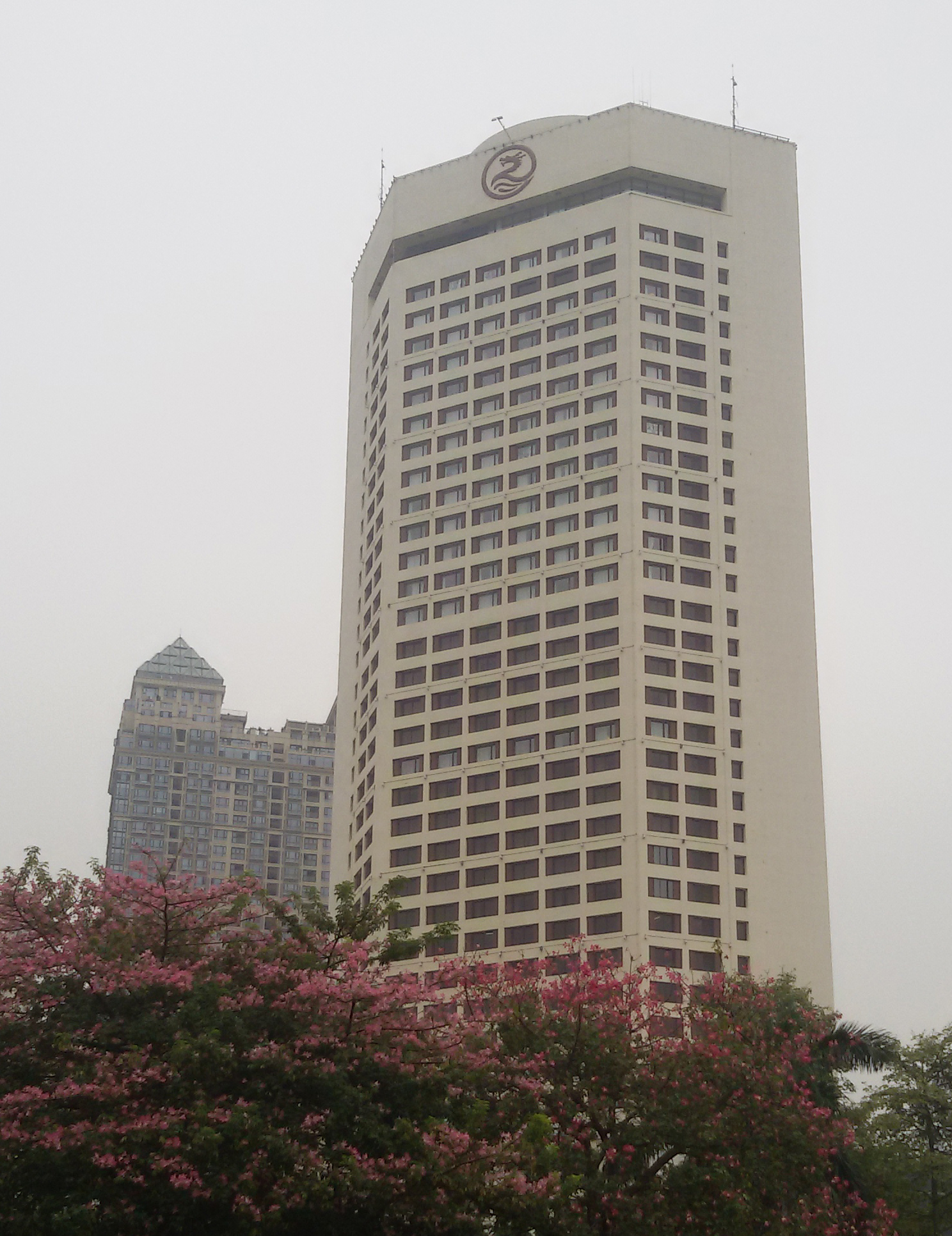
- Interactive map of the Hotel Landmark Canton area

General information
- Location: Yuexiu District, Guangzhou, China
- Coordinates: 23.1178°N 113.2626°E

Height
- Height: 126 m (413 ft)

Technical details
- Floor count: 37

Other information
- Number of rooms: 672

The Hotel Landmark Canton (Chinese: 華廈大酒店) is a 4 star hotel in downtown Guangzhou, China. It is located on the banks of the Pearl River, beside the Haizhu Plaza.

== History ==
This hotel was originally named the Overseas Chinese Building, which opened on May 1, 1957, located at 8 Qiaoguang Rd, Yuexiu, Guangzhou, Guangdong, China. Premier Zhou Enlai visited Guangzhou in 1959 and visited the Overseas Chinese Building. In 1966, The Overseas Chinese Building was renamed Dongfeng Plaza, but reverted to its original name in 1985, when the hotel which was managed jointly, by Guangdong China Travel Agency and Nanyang Huazhong (HK) Co., Ltd.

Vice President Wang Zhen visited the hotel for an administrative inspection in November 1986. Former Chairman Yang Shangkun came to the Overseas Chinese Building for the 110th anniversary of the birth of La Zhongkai on April 23, 1987.

The building was renovated in April 1987, then rebuilt in June 1987 by its two joint owners. The new Overseas Chinese Building was visited by the vice-chairperson of the NPC, Kang Keqing, with Ye Xuanping in July 1987. The vice-president, Wang Zhen, stayed at the Overseas Chinese Building twice, and composed the article, "Chaozhou foods top those elsewhere", on March 19, 1988. The Overseas Chinese Building was reconstructed, with work finishing on June 28, 1990. It was renamed the Hotel Landmark Canton in February 1991.

On February 16, 1991, Chairman of the NPC, Wan Li, inspected the hotel, accompanied by Lin Ruo, Yi Meihou, Chen Kaizhi and Situ Rongsheng. Vice Chairman of the CPPCC National Committee, Qian Weichang, and Minister of China's Overseas Chinese Affairs Office of the State Council, Liao Hui, inspected Hotel Landmark Canton on June 12, 1991. Vietnamese President Trần Đức Lương stayed at the hotel in July 2005.

The Hotel Landmark Canton was rated a four-star hotel by the State Administration of Tourism on October 11, 1994.

== Awards ==
- "100 Excellent Star-rated Hotels in 1995"
- "Best Hotel of High-quality Service in the Competition of 1996 GD CTS Cup"
- "Best Service CTS Cup Award" - 2009

== See also ==
- Pearl River Delta
