= Visitor management =

Tracking the usage of a public building or site

Visitor management refers to a set of practices or hardware additions that administrators can use to monitor the usage of a building or site. By gathering this information, a visitor management system can record the usage of facilities by specific visitors and provide documentation of visitors' whereabouts.

Proponents of a comprehensive visitor management system point to increased security, particularly in schools, as one benefit. As more parents demand action from schools that will protect children from sexual predators, some school districts are turning to modern visitor management systems that not only track a visitor's stay but also check the visitor's information against national and local criminal databases.

== Visitor management technologies ==
=== Computer visitor management systems ===
Basic computer or electronic visitor management systems use a computer network to monitor and record visitor information and are commonly hosted on an iPad or a touchless kiosk.

An electronic visitor management system improves upon most of the negative points of a pen and paper system. Visitor ID can be checked against national and local databases, as well as in-house databases for potential security problems. These systems in some cases scan the ID of the visitor (commonly a drivers license) and check the scan against criminal and sex offender databases.

=== Visitor management software as a service ===
The legacy on-site visitor management software is considered to be expensive and requires maintenance, It can present operational challenges due to overlapping responsibilities between administrative staff, facility management, and IT departments. Additionally, organizations with multiple locations may face difficulties in implementing a unified system, particularly when individual sites operate with varying processes and requirements.

In response to these limitations, modern visitor management solutions including those developed by providers such as IDCUBE have introduced more centralized and scalable approaches, enabling organizations to standardize visitor workflows while accommodating site-specific needs.

SaaS visitor management software for schools allows administrators to screen visitors upon entrance, often checking for sex offender status, and restricting access to unauthorized entrants.

SaaS visitor management software for the real estate industry allows landlords and managers to remotely control and monitor access rights without the need to pass physical keys and keycards to new tenants.

SaaS visitor management software for commercial offices allows facilities managers to automate their building's reception area with advocates of this type of system claiming a variety of benefits, including both security and privacy. Many modern SaaS visitor management systems are tablet-based apps and are thin client solutions operating software as a service in the cloud.

=== Visitor management systems on smartphones ===
Smart phone based visitor management system work similarly to a web-based system, but hosts can get real-time notifications or alerts on their device. Hosts can allow or deny visits to guests based on their interests or availability.

Smartphone-based visitor management systems also enable features like automatic and touchless sign-in using technologies that include QR codes and geofencing.

=== Integrations with other systems ===
Cloud-based visitor management systems offer integration with other workplace management systems, such as communication apps, access control, data reports, and Wi-Fi credentials. An integrated visitor management system organises, streamlines, and collects important data that facilities managers can use to understand their workplaces.

Featuring an open API enables modern visitor management systems to integrate with any software and workflows without limitation.

=== Types of Visitor Management Systems ===
- Pen and paper-based system
- On-premises software
- Cloud-based software

=== Use Cases ===
- Hospitals
- Schools
- Commercial buildings
- Offices
- Convention Centers/ Manufactories for contractor management
- Co-working places

== See also ==
- Access control
- Optical turnstile
- Identity document
- Proximity card
- Boom barrier
- Cross-device tracking
- QR code
- Facial recognition system
