= Combinations and permutations =

Combinations and permutations in the mathematical sense are described in several articles.

Described together, in-depth:

- Twelvefold way

Explained separately in a more accessible way:

- Combination
- Permutation

For meanings outside of mathematics, please see both words’ disambiguation pages:

- Combination (disambiguation)
- Permutation (disambiguation)
