= Combined =

Combined may refer to:

- Alpine combined (skiing), the combination of slalom and downhill skiing as a single event
  - Super combined (skiing)
- Nordic combined (skiing), the combination of cross country skiing and ski jumping as a single event
- The Combined (Group), a criminal organization
- CombinedX, a Swedish group of IT companies

== See also ==
- Combo (disambiguation)
- Combine (disambiguation)
- Combination (disambiguation)
