= Combo =

Combo may refer to:

== Technology ==
- Combo television unit, a television with either a VCR or a DVD player built into a single unit
- Combo drive, a type of optical drive that can read CDs and DVDs
- A guitar amplifier incorporating one or more loudspeakers in the same case as the electronics
- Combo organ, a type of portable electronic organ popular in the 1960s
- Combo box, a widget in computer graphics
- Combo washer dryer, a combination in a single cabinet of a washing machine and a clothes dryer
- Opel Combo, also known as the Vauxhall Combo, Chevrolet Combo, and Holden Combo; a van produced by Opel since 1994

== Other uses ==
- A small musical ensemble
  - Popular beat combo, a synonym for pop group which has become a British cliché
- Combo meal, a group of menu items offered together at a lower price than they would cost individually
- Combos, a brand of snack food
- COMBO, or COMBO Culture Kidnapper, a French street artist
- Combo (video gaming), a combination of moves used in video games
- Striking combination, a combination of strikes in martial arts
- T.J. Combo, a character from the video game Killer Instinct
- A character from This is England
- Combo Ayouba, the Comoran colonel and senior member who died in 2010
- Combo Rangers, a series of Webcomics created in 1998 by Japanese-Brazilian author Fábio Yabu
- A character from Jet Set Radio
- A character in Breaking Bad
- Combo!, a 1960 album by Henry Mancini

== See also ==
- Combination (disambiguation)
- Comb (disambiguation)
- Combi (disambiguation)
- Kombo (disambiguation)
