= Combination (disambiguation) =

A combination is a mathematical collection of things in a context where their specific order is irrelevant.

Combination, combinations, or combo may also refer to:

- Combination (chess), a relatively long sequence of chess moves, involving temporary loss of materials
- Combination (jump), in horseback riding
- Combination bus, a purpose-built truck with a "passenger container"
- Combination company, in the late 19th century, a touring theater company that performed only one play
- Combination Game, a style of association football based around teamwork and cooperation
- Combination meal, typically includes food items and a beverage
- Combination tone, a psychoacoustic phenomenon
- Combinations (finance), the simultaneous buying or selling of one or more options that differ in one or more of the options' variables
- Combinations (album), 2007 album by Eisley
- Striking combination, several strikes in a row in combat sports
- The Combination (film), 2009 Australian drama, directed by David Field
- The Combination, an early English football league, 1888–89 and 1890–1911

== See also ==
- Combination car (disambiguation)
- Combine (disambiguation)
- Combined (disambiguation)
- Combo (disambiguation)
- Motorcycle combination, sidecar
- Original combination
- Combination Act 1799
