= Comb (disambiguation) =

A comb is a toothed device used for straightening and cleaning hair or fibers.

Comb may also refer to:

- Comb, the raised part of a long gun's buttstock where the shooter rest his/her cheek during aiming
- Comb (anatomy), a fleshy growth or crest on the top of the head of certain birds and reptiles
- Combe or comb, a small valley without a river
- Combing, a method used to straighten fibers for spinning
- Comb drive, a linear motor often used in microtechnology
- Comb generator, a signal generator that produces multiple harmonics of its input signal
- Comb space, a topological space
- Honeycomb, an hexagonal wax structure built by bees

== See also ==
- Combs (disambiguation)
- Combe (disambiguation)
- Combo (disambiguation)
- Combine (disambiguation)
- combinatio nova or comb. nov.
