= Kombo (disambiguation) =

Kombo was a territory and kingdom in Gambia during the colonial period.

Kombo may also refer to:

== Places ==
- Kombo Central, a district of Gambia's Western Division
- Kombo East, a district of Gambia's Western Division
- Kombo South, a district of Gambia's Western Division
- Kombo North/Saint Mary, a district of Gambia's Western Division
- Kombo Kombo, a settlement in Kenya's Coast Province
- Kombo-Abedimo, a commune and arrondissement in the Ndian département, Southwest Province, western Cameroon.
- Kombo-Idinti, a commune and arrondissement in the Ndian département, Southwest Province, western Cameroon

== People with the surname ==
- Ernest Kombo, Congolese Roman Catholic Bishop
- Musikari Kombo, Kenyan politician
- Pierrette Kombo, Congolese politician

== Other ==
- Kombo (company), a transport website based in France
- Kombo Animation, a former animation studio based in Finland that was succeeded by Rovio Animation
- Pycnanthus angolensis, a tree species or its product, kombo butter

== See also ==
- Combo (disambiguation)
- Kombi (disambiguation)
