= Martin Gren =

Swedish entrepreneur

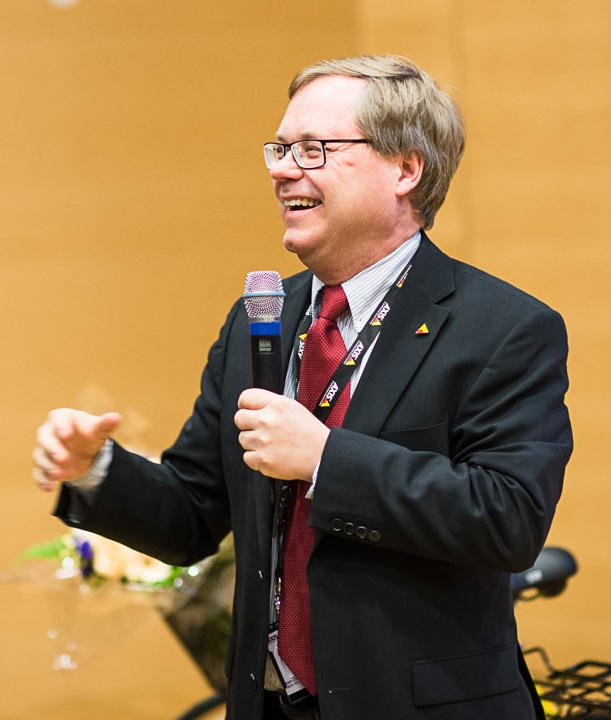
- Born: September 15, 1962 (age 64)

Martin Gren (born September 15, 1962) is a Swedish entrepreneur and inventor of the first network camera.

In 1984, Gren founded Axis Communications, together with Mikael Karlsson and Keith Bloodworth, a company that initially developed and sold print servers, but which later came to be a world leader in network video. In 1996 Gren invented the first network camera, the AXIS 200, NetEye, together with Carl-Axel Alm.

== Professional career ==
Martin Gren has had both executive and operational roles within Axis Communications, including as Chief Technology Officer of Axis Camera Division and Director of New Projects. He was a member of the board of the parent company Axis AB, and board member of Askero storybook Publishing Co., Eikos Corporation, Grenspecialisten AB, Handelsbolaget decade, H. Lundén Holding Ltd. and Tobii Technology AB.

Martin Gren has received numerous prizes including the "Lifetime Achievement Award" from the security trade magazine Detektor in 2009.

== Investments ==
In 2015, Martin Gren sold all his holdings in Axis Communications and started a holding company to manage his investments. He primarily invests in technology companies and known investments are HMS Networks, CombinedX, Crayon Group Holding and more than 30 other companies.
