= Kombi =

Kombi may refer to:

- Battle of Kombi, a 1647 battle between Ndongo-Matamba (assisted by the Dutch) and the Portuguese
- Kombi, a Japanese term for a comedy duo
- Kombi (band), a Polish pop rock band
- Kombini, a type of Japanese convenience store
- Kombi, Iran, a village in Razavi Khorasan Province, Iran

== Vehicles ==
- Volkswagen Type 2 or Volkswagen Kombi, a panel van introduced in 1950
- Izh 2125 or Kombi, a compact car produced by the Soviet Union
- A term for a minibus in South Africa and Zimbabwe

== See also ==
- Combi (disambiguation)
- Kombo (disambiguation)
