= Combi =

Combi may refer to:

- Gianpiero Combi, an Italian footballer
- Combi aircraft, aircraft designed to carry both passengers and freight
- Combi boiler, a kind of central heating boiler which is popular in Europe
- Combi (car style), also known as a station wagon or estate car
- Combi coupé, a term used by Saab for some of its hatchback automobile models
- Combi steamer, an oven type used for baking with dry heat, steam heat, or a combination of both to yield humidity control
- Kia Combi or Asia Combi, a series of mini-buses built from 1983 to 2002
- Truvelo Combi, a model of camera used to measure vehicle speed

== See also ==
- Combo (disambiguation)
- Kombi (disambiguation)
