= CombinedX =

Swedish IT consulting company

Coordinates: 59.37625°N 13.508417°E

- Formerly: Ninetech (Nine Technicians) (1993 - 2016); Combined Excellence (2016 - 2021)
- Company type: Publicly traded aktiebolag
- Traded as: FWB: COMBINEDX; Nasdaq Stockholm: CX
- ISIN: SE0012065589
- Industry: Professional services; Information technology consulting
- Founded: 1993 in Karlstad, Sweden
- Headquarters: Karlstad, Sweden
- Key people: Jörgen Qwist; CEO; Niklas Hellberg; Chairman of the Board
- Services: Digital Transformation; Business Consulting; Cloud
- Revenue: ▲765.7 million kr (2023)
- Total assets: ▲633.3 million kr (2023)
- Total equity: ▲375.9 million kr (2023)
- Number of employees: 492 (2023)
- Subsidiaries: List: Nethouse; Elvenite; Aspire; Netgain; Two; Ninetech; Absfront; Redway; Anytrust; M3CS
- Website: www.combinedx.com

CombinedX is a Sweden-based information technology (IT) services and consulting company founded in 1993 and composed of 10 wholly owned companies that operate in Sweden and Norway.

Its head office is located in Karlstad and the company has many local offices in Stockholm, Gothenburg, Malmö, Umeå, Oslo, Bergen and elsewhere. CombinedX is publicly traded on Nasdaq First North since March 2022.

== Operations ==
The group consists of ten wholly owned companies that have been created through acquisitions, internal spin-offs and mergers which provide various services in digital transformation, business systems, data analysis, automation, identity management, managed infrastructure services, IT security, IoT and others.

It does local and global projects. Customers include both private companies and a number of public authorities, regions and companies. CombinedX company Ninetech is a digital partner for both Volvo and Volvo Cars, and has been commissioned to build Volvo's digital meeting place in the upcoming World of Volvo.

Group's companies have won various prizes and awards for effective customer solutions, "Business of the year", "European Business Awards" and others.

== IPO ==
CombinedX's IPO was heavily oversubscribed and the company debuted on the Nasdaq First North on March 28, 2022. Several widely known Swedish investors participated in the IPO, e.g. Axis founder Martin Gren, Investment AB Spiltan, Unionen and others. Norwegian investment bank ABG Sundal Collier is the liquidity provider for CombinedX's stock.
