= ETRAX CRIS =

Series of microprocessors

The ETRAX CRIS is a RISC ISA and series of CPUs designed and manufactured by Axis Communications for use in embedded systems since 1993. The name is an acronym of the chip's features: Ethernet, Token Ring, AXis - Code Reduced Instruction Set. Token Ring support has been taken out from the latest chips as it has become obsolete.

== Types of chips ==
The CGA-1 (Coax Gate Array) was the first microprocessor developed by Axis Communications. It contains IBM 3270 (coax) and IBM 5250 (Twinax) communications. The chip has a microcontroller and various I/O's such as serial and parallel. The CGA-1 chip was designed by Martin Gren and Staffan Göransson.

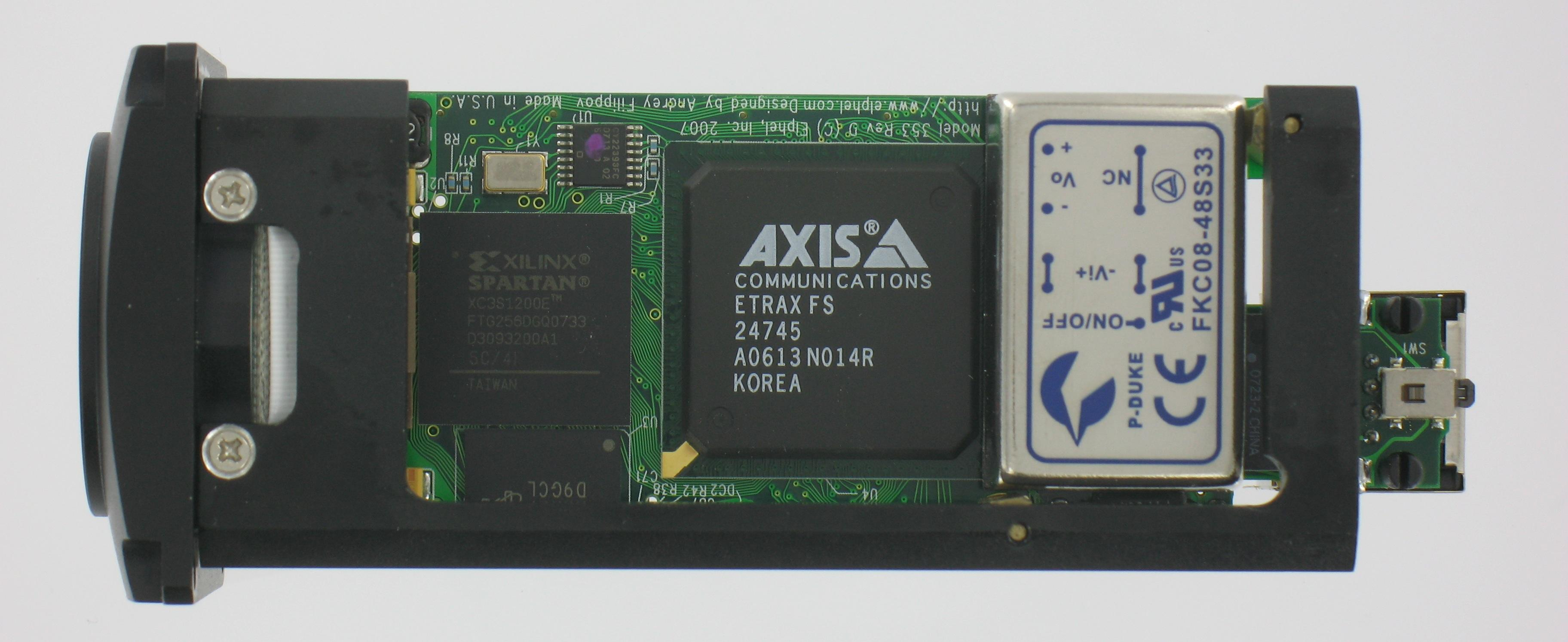
An Elphel Reconfigurable Network Camera based on ETRAX FS CPU and Xilinx Spartan 3e FPGA.

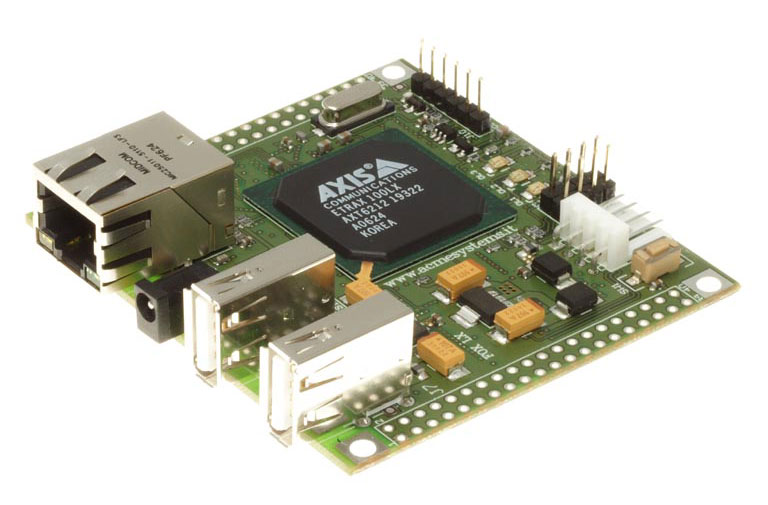
A FOX board LX 4+16 (4 MB flash and 16 MB SDRAM).

=== ETRAX ===
- In 1993, Axis developed the ETRAX-1 Ethernet Controller, which has 10 Mbit/s Ethernet and Token Ring controllers.
- In 1995, Axis introduced the ETRAX-4 SoC which contains a Ethernet Controller, CPU, Memory Interface, SCSI controller, and parallel and serial I/O.
- In 1997, Axis introduced the ETRAX 100 SoC which features a 10/100 Mbit/s Ethernet Controller, ATA controller, and Wide SCSI controller. The chip introduced on-chip unified instruction and data cache along with direct memory access.

=== ETRAX 100LX ===
In 2000, Axis Introduced the ETRAX 100LX SoC which features a MMU, USB controller, and SDRAM interface. The CPU is capable of 100 MIPS. The chip is able to run the Linux kernel without modifications except for low-level support. The chip's maximum TDP is 0.35 Watts. As of Linux kernel 4.17, the architecture has been dropped due to being obsolete.

Specifications:

- 32-bit RISC CPU core
- 10/100 Mbit/s Ethernet controller
- 4 asynchronous serial ports
- 2 synchronous serial ports
- 2 USB ports
- 2 Parallel ports
- 4 ATA (IDE) ports
- 2 Narrow SCSI ports (or 1 Wide)
- Support for SDRAM, Flash, EEPROM, SRAM

=== ETRAX 100LX MCM ===
The ETRAX 100LX MCM is based on the ETRAX 100 LX. The chip has internal flash memory, SDRAM, and an Ethernet PHYceiver. The Chip can come with 2 MB flash and 8 MB SDRAM or 4 MB flash and 16 MB SDRAM.

=== ETRAX FS ===
Introduced in 2005 with full Linux 2.6 support, the chip features:

- A 200 MIPS 32-bit RISC CRIS CPU core with 16 kB instruction and data cache
- 128 kB on-chip RAM
- Two 10/100 Mbit/s Ethernet controllers
- Crypto accelerator supporting AES, DES, Triple DES, SHA-1, and MD5
- I/O processor supporting PC-Card, PCI, USB, SCSI and ATA

=== ARTPEC ===
The Axis Real-Time Picture Encoder Chip (ARTPEC) is a system on a chip (SoC) developed by Axis Communications. There are currently nine generations of the chip, all of which run AXIS OS, a modified version of Linux designed for embedded devices. Not all products developed by Axis Communications use its custom chip. The chip is typically found in high-performance devices such as higher-end cameras, while lower-cost devices use SoCs from Ambarella.

List of SoCs developed
Release year	Name	CPU	Features
1999	ARTPEC-1	ETRAX CRIS	Runs μClinux, an embedded operating system which became known as Embedded Linux
2003	ARTPEC-2	ETRAX CRIS	Combined digital signal processor and CPU into one package Hardware accelerated MPEG-4 video encoding
2007	ARTPEC-3	ETRAX CRIS	Hardware accelerated H.264 video encoding Capable of capturing 1080P video at 30 frames per second
2011	ARTPEC-4	Multi-threaded MIPS CPU (34Kc)	Implements Lightfinder, a technology that allows a camera to see color in low light or challenging light conditions
2013	ARTPEC-5	Dual-core MIPS CPU (1004Kf)	Implements Forensic Capture, a High Dynamic Range technology that increases forensic details in a scene Implements Video encoders that utilize a technology called Zipstream to reduce bandwidth while maintaining video quality and detail
2017	ARTPEC-6	ARM Cortex-A9	Can run video analytics capable of identifying objects such as humans and cars Capable of capturing 4K video at 30 frames per second
2019	ARTPEC-7	ARM Cortex-A9	Implements a machine learning processor Hardware accelerated H.265 video encoding Implements secure boot, which prevents booting of unauthorized firmware Improves low-light imaging via a technology called Lightfinder 2.0
2021	ARTPEC-8	ARM Cortex-A53	Implements a deep learning processor Can run video analytics that recognize various object characteristics such as clothing
2024	ARTPEC-9	ARM Cortex-A55	Hardware accelerated AV1 video encoding Faster deep learning processor capable of identifying more object characteristics
