= Ray Mauritsson =

Swedish business leader (born 1962)

- Born: October 28, 1962 (age 62); Sweden
- Education: University of Lund
- Occupation: Business leader

Ray Mauritsson (born October 28, 1962) is a Swedish business leader.

== Early years and education ==
Mauritsson has a Master of Science degree in engineering physics from the University of Lund, and an Executive MBA degree from the Business School at the University of Lund.

== Career ==
In 1995, Mauritsson joined the IP video surveillance company Axis Communications, where he became CEO in 2003.

In 2009, Mauritsson received the prestigious Gold Shield Award which is awarded by the Global Security Industry Alliance's (GSIA) to security professionals who have made "outstanding contributions in the global security industry". Three years later he was appointed the CEO of the year in Sweden by the leadership site Motivation.se and the educational company executive Executive People. The motivation was that he "with pioneering products and new technologies within a decade successfully strengthened the company's position as market leader in its field with a growth rate of between 11 and 39 percent a year."
