= Axis Communications =

Swedish manufacturer of surveillance cameras

Coordinates: 55.7185°N 13.2203°E

Axis Communications AB
- Type: Subsidiary
- Industry: Video surveillance
- Founded: 1984; 42 years ago
- Founders: Mikael Karlsson; Martin Gren; Keith Bloodworth
- Headquarters: Lund, Sweden
- Area served: Worldwide
- Key people: Ray Mauritsson (CEO)
- Products: Access control; Network cameras; Intercoms; Network audio; Radar; Video analytics; Video management systems
- Revenue: ▲20.763 billion kr (2025)
- Operating income: ▼2.311 billion kr (2025)
- Net income: ▼1.826 billion kr (2025)
- Total assets: ▲17.302 billion kr (2025)
- Total equity: ▲12.197 billion kr (2025)
- Number of employees: 5,273 (Q4 2025)
- Parent: Canon Inc.
- Website: axis.com

Axis Communications AB is a Swedish manufacturer of network cameras, access control, intercoms and network audio devices for the physical security and video surveillance industries. Since 2015, it operates as an independent subsidiary of Canon Inc.

== History ==
=== 1980s ===
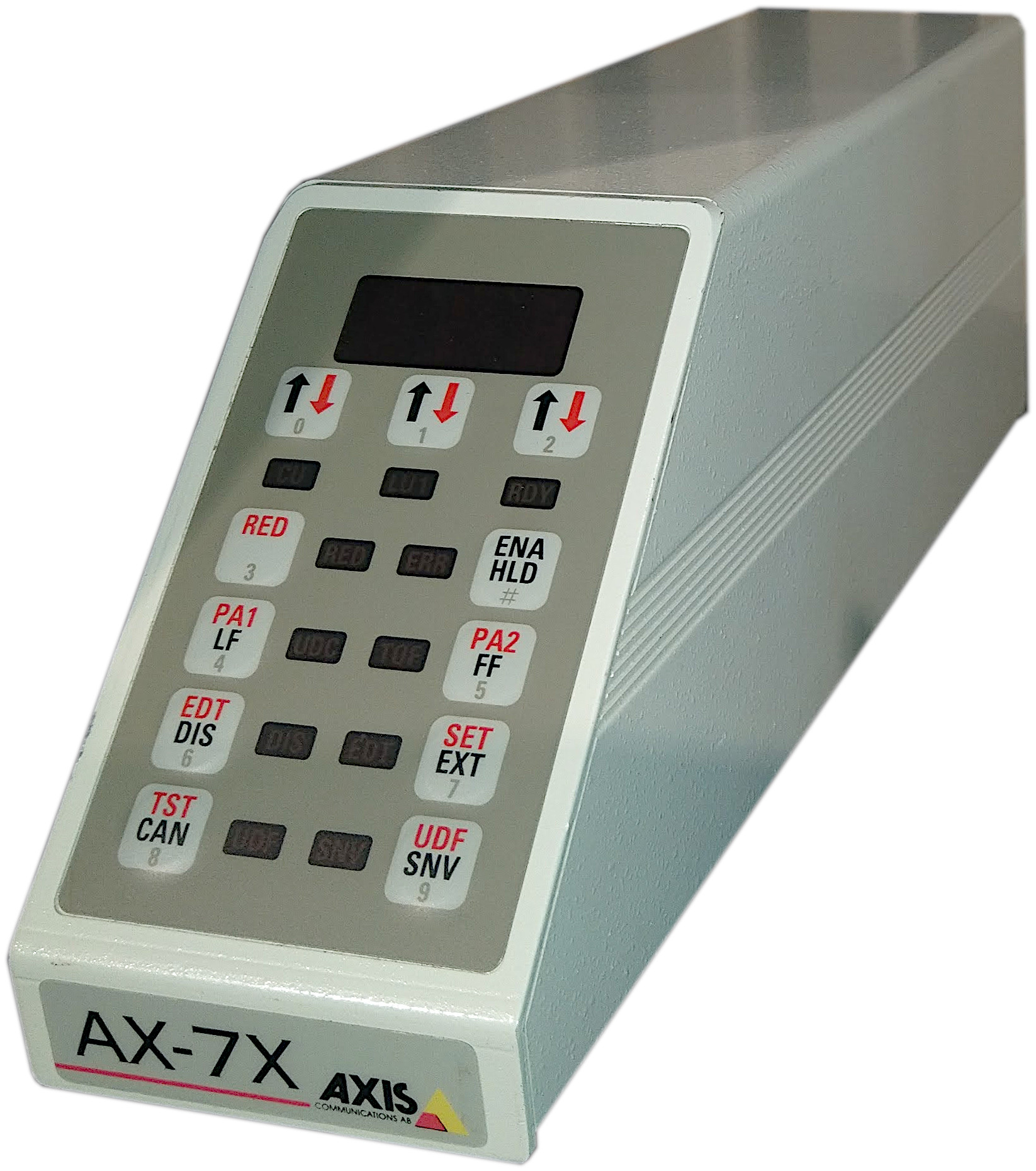
AXIS AX-7X print server for IBM mainframes (1985)

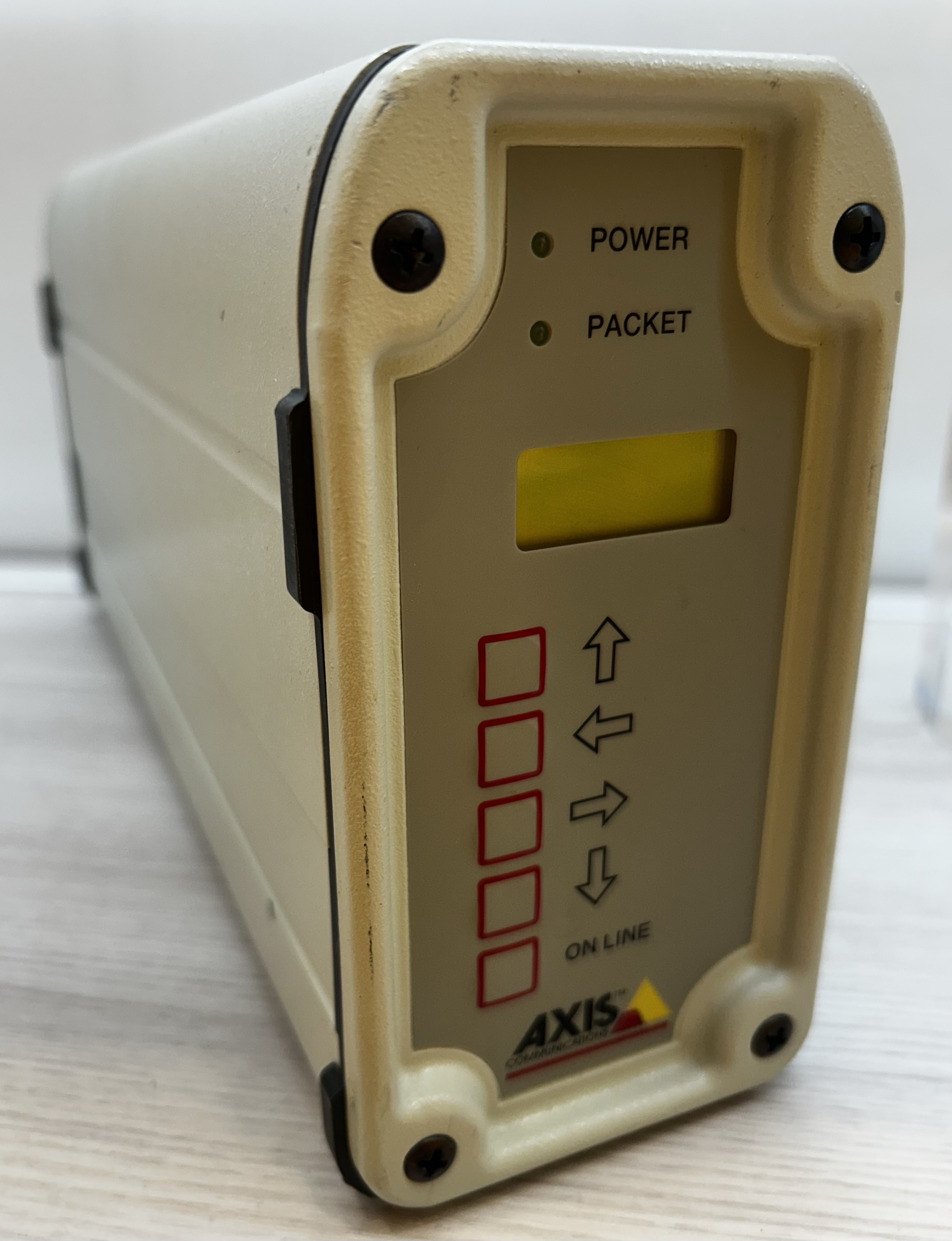
AXIS AX-5 ethernet print server (1989)

Axis Communications was founded in 1984 by Martin Gren, Mikael Karlsson and Keith Bloodworth in Lund, Sweden. Gren and Karlsson had previously, since 1982, operated a consultancy called Gren & Karlsson Firmware Aktiebolag that provided services to Dataindustrier AB.

Axis Communications initially developed and sold protocol converters and printer interfaces for the connection of PC printers in IBM mainframe and minicomputer environments, for example IBM System/360. In 1986, it developed its first custom microchip, TGA1, for communications with IBM midrange systems.

By the end of the 1980s, Axis Communications opened its first U.S. sales office in Boston, Massachusetts.

=== 1990s ===
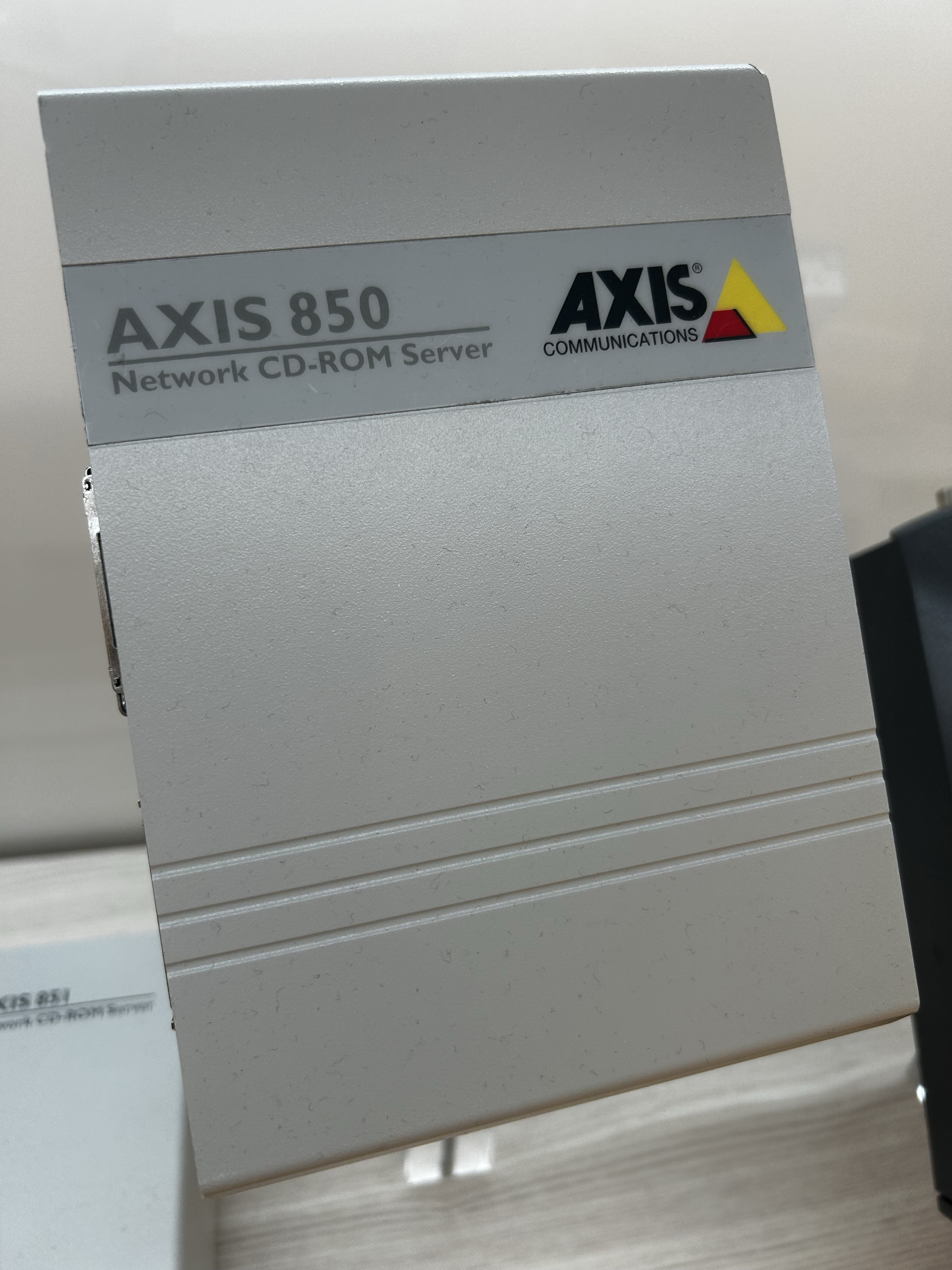
AXIS 850 CD-ROM server (1995)

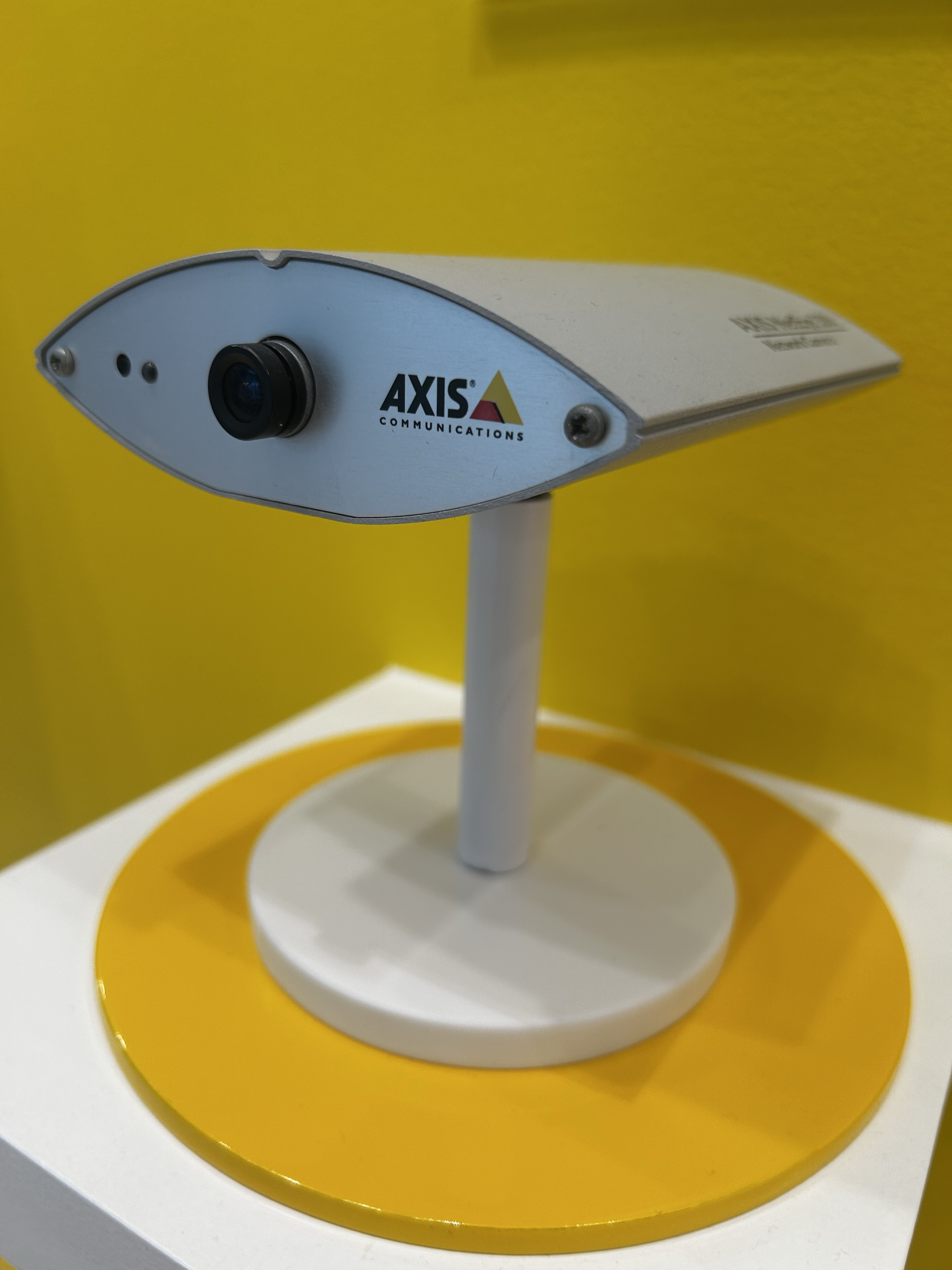
AXIS 200 network camera (1996)

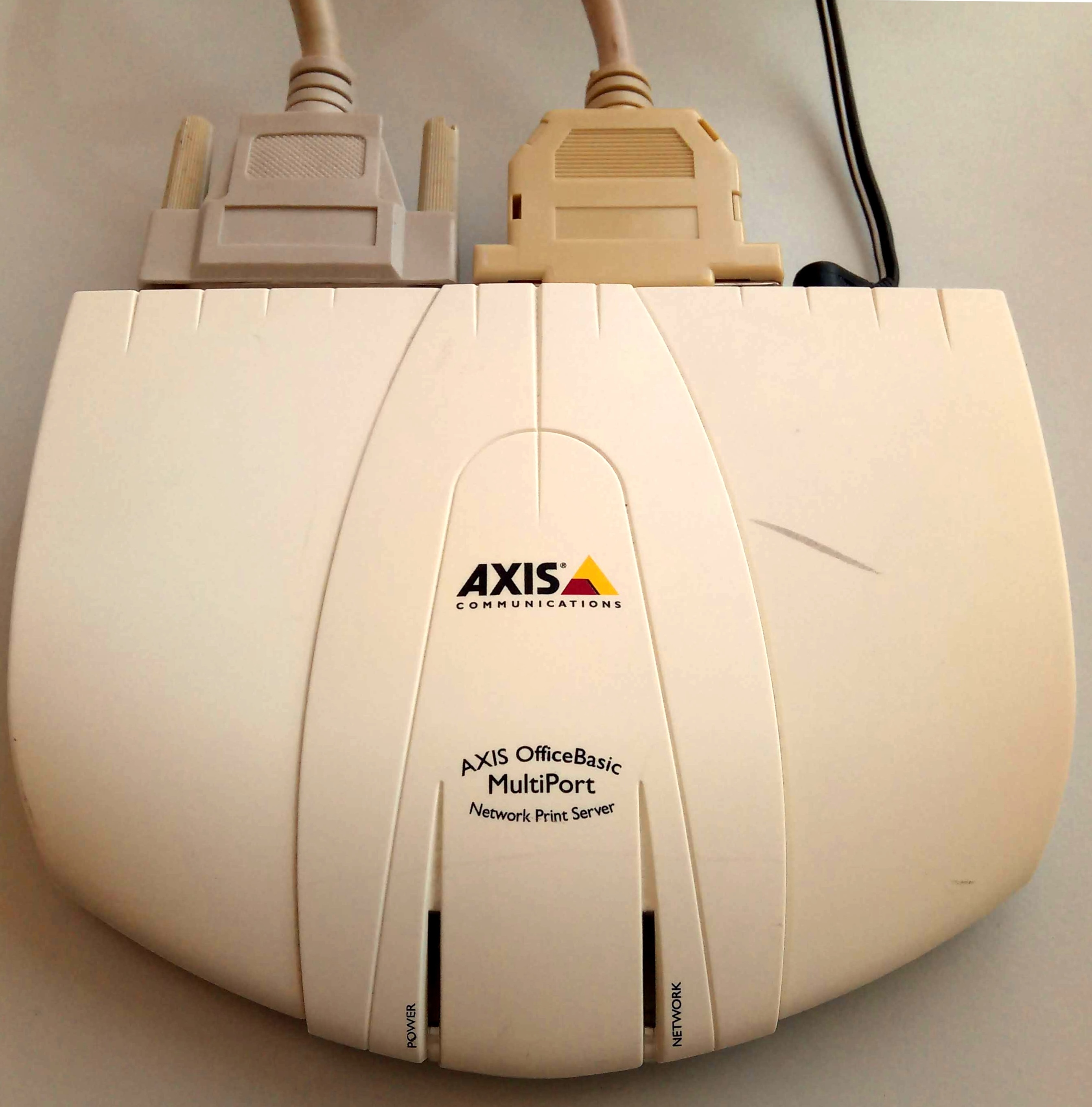
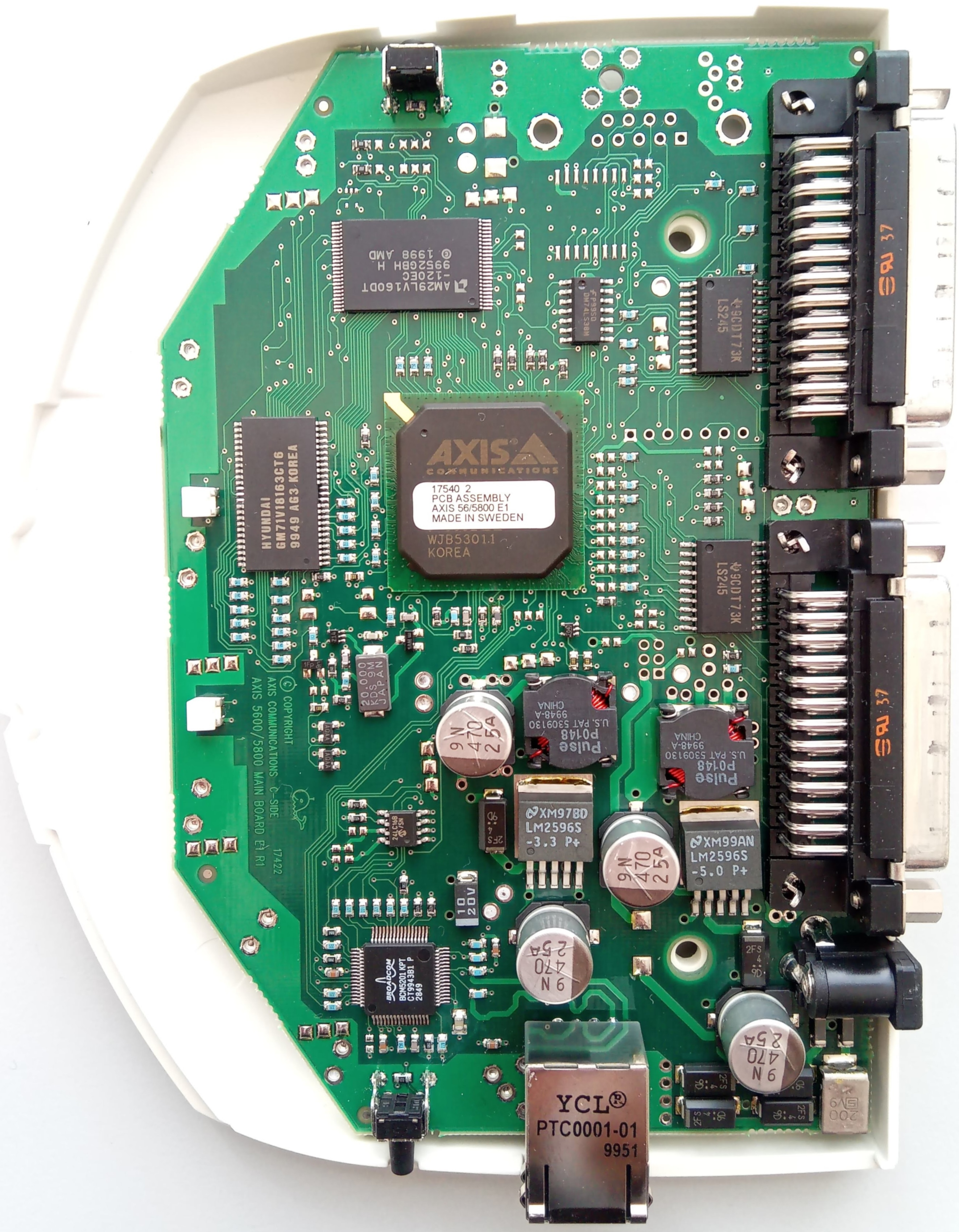
Axis 5600 print server (around 1998)
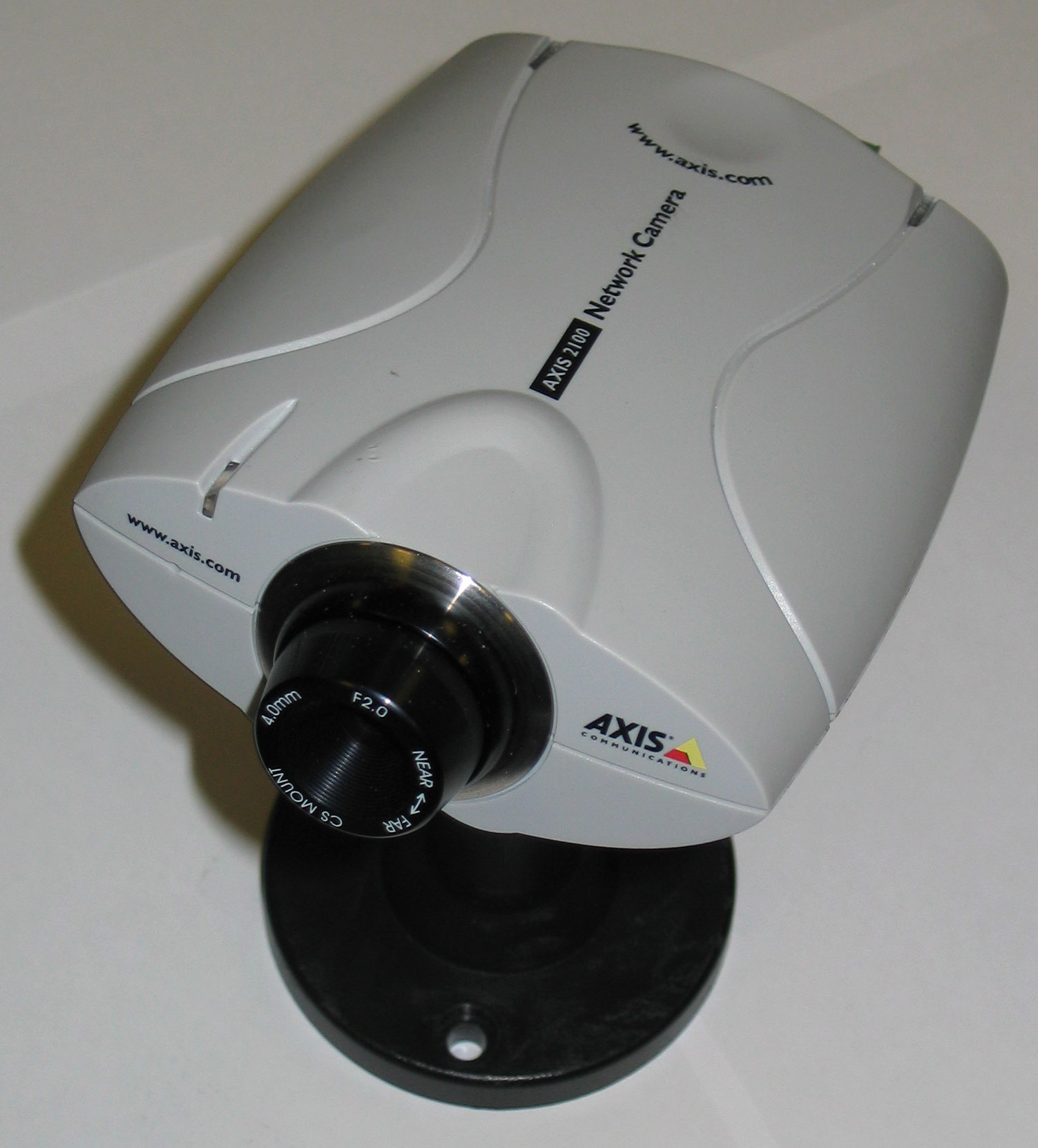
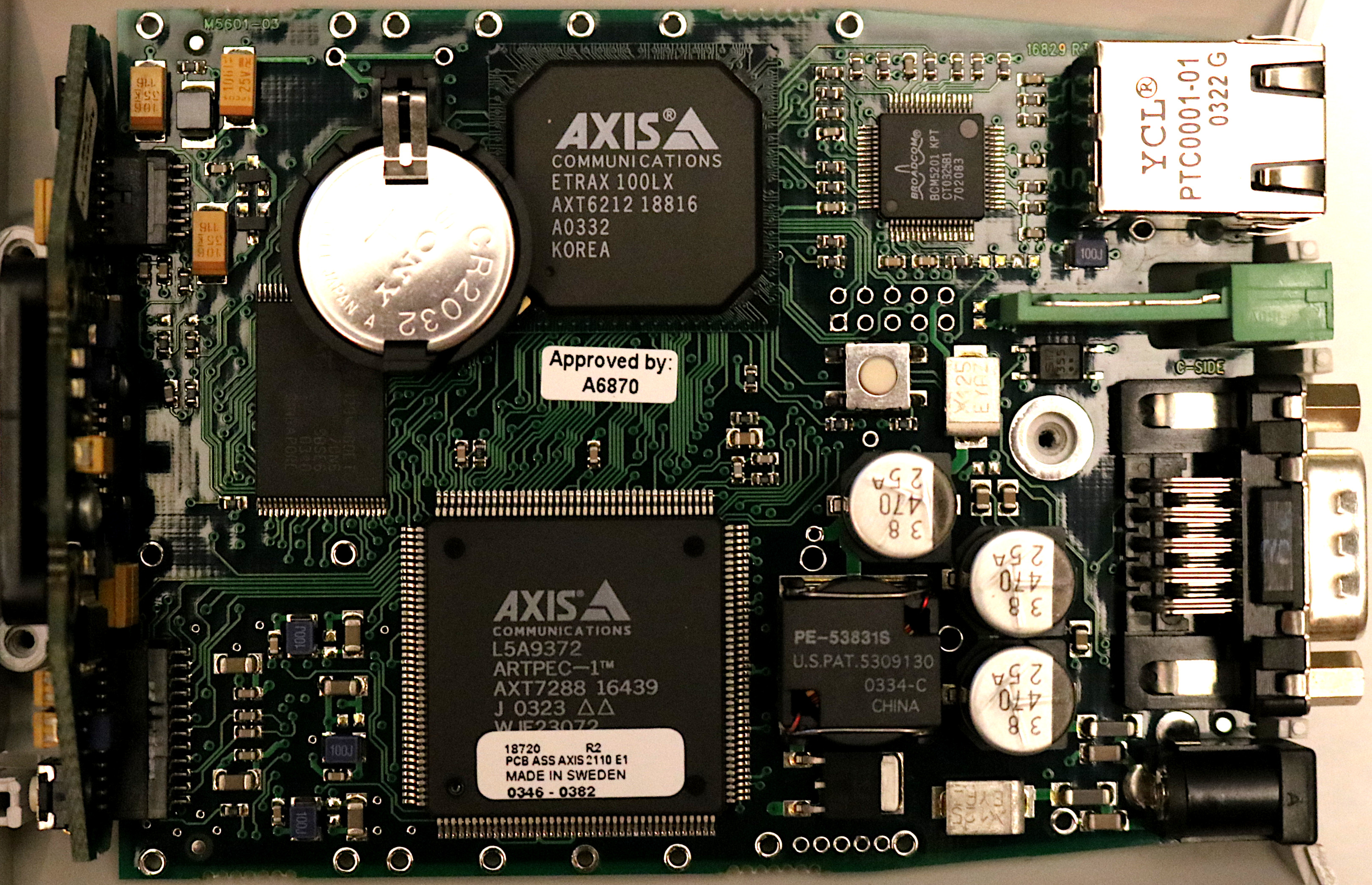
AXIS 2100 network camera (1999) and its circuit board, with ETRAX 100LX and ARTPEC-1 chips running embedded Linux systems

In the early 1990s, the company started shifting its focus away from IBM mainframes towards networking and the TCP/IP protocol. In 1991, Axis Communications introduced a multi-protocol print server supporting both TCP/IP and NetWare.

In 1993, the company developed its own CPU Architecture, ETRAX CRIS (Ethernet, Token Ring Axis Code Reduced Instruction Set), a RISC processor for use in embedded devices, with built-in support for the most common LAN technologies at the time.

In 1995, the company introduced a file-server-independent, multi-protocol CD-ROM server, supporting TCP/IP (NFS) and Windows (SMB), for Ethernet networks, the AXIS 850.

Sales offices were opened in Tokyo, Japan in 1991, Hong Kong in 1992, and Singapore in 1995.

In 1996, Axis Communications introduced the industry's first network camera, the AXIS NetEye 200.

The introduction of this new product category came following an experimental project, where Axis engineer Carl-Axel Alm had been supervising some students building a network-based video conferencing prototype for their graduate thesis. In the end, company founder Gren saw no market for such a system at the time, but he had recently been on a business trip to Japan, where a potential network storage customer had a large stock of analog video cameras and suggested that Axis found a way to make them network-connected.

This combination of technical experience and ideas led to the development of the network camera. The company decided that if sales exceeded 10,000 units, they would continue developing new models. 14,000 were sold. The first documented end customer was Steve Wozniak. The main early adopters were, however, oil platforms and banks.

The possible applications of the first model were limited by its low frame rate, just one every 17 seconds. To cost-efficiently improve performance, the company decided to develop its own system on a chip for video compression, the ARTPEC-1 (Axis Real-Time Picture Encoder Chip). It also chose to use embedded Linux as the operating system for the new product.

In 1999, the AXIS 2100 network camera was introduced, using the new compression chip. According to the company, it was the world's first mass-produced device to use embedded Linux. For Linux to work efficiently and reliably on a device with Flash memory, a new file system was needed. Therefore, the development included the creation of the file system JFFS, which the company released as open source along with the new product.

=== 2000s ===
In 2003 and 2004, the company introduced the AXIS 205 and 206, respectively, which were the smallest network cameras of their time.

In 2008, Axis Communications, together with Bosch and Sony, announced that the companies would cooperate to standardize the interface of network video products and form a new industry standards body called ONVIF (Open Network Video Interface Forum). The company's first product with ONVIF support was the AXIS P3301, launched in 2009.

=== 2010s ===
On February 10, 2015, Japanese multinational corporation Canon Inc., which specializes in the manufacture of imaging and optical products, announced a cash bid of 23.6 billion Swedish kronor (US$2.83 billion) to acquire Axis Communications. While Canon is the majority shareholder, Axis is run independently. Canon's network cameras have been sold and supported by Axis Communications in the EMEA (Europe, the Middle East and Africa) region since September 1, 2016, and in North America since October 1, 2016. In November 2018, Axis Communications was delisted from Nasdaq Stockholm.

On February 1, 2016, Axis Communications acquired Citilog, a video analytics provider for traffic and transportation security and safety applications. On May 30, Axis Communications acquired 2N Telecommunications, a provider of IP intercom systems based in the Czech Republic. On June 3, 2016, Axis Communications acquired the Swedish company Cognimatics, a video analytics provider for retail applications such as people counting, queue measurement and occupancy estimation.

In May 2018, Axis Communications opened a research and development office for software in Linköping, Sweden.

=== 2020s ===
On April 30, 2021, Axis Communications announced that it was selling Citilog, citing challenges in finding "desired synergies because of our different go-to-market models."

In 2024, Axis Communications opened a research and development office for chip design in Stockholm, Sweden.

In 2025, Axis acquired Swedish drone-detection company Skysense AB, followed by Czech license plate recognition company FF Group.

== Market ==
In 2025, half of the global market for network cameras was estimated to be in China, where domestic suppliers dominate. In the rest of the world, Axis Communications is considered the market leader. The main competitors are Bosch, Hanwha Vision, Motorola Solutions, and Panasonic.

In 2025, 58 percent of sales were in the Americas, 32 percent in EMEA, and 10 percent in Asia-Pacific. In the first 10 years since Axis Communications was acquired by Canon in 2015, the average yearly growth was 13 percent, and the share of Canon’s total sales increased from 2 to 7 percent.

Installations include the City of Dubuque, the City of Houston, Madrid Buses, MetLife Stadium, Moscow Metro, the Statue of Liberty, Stockholm public transport, Sydney Airport, Toronto Airport, and the White House.

== Operations ==
Axis Communications has offices in more than 50 countries and employs around 5,000 people (average 2025). Of these, around 750 are in the Americas, around 4,000 in EMEA, and around 300 in Asia-Pacific.

Around 18 percent of sales is invested in research and development, which is concentrated to Sweden. In Lund, where the head office is located, Axis Communications is the largest private-sector employer, with around 3,000 people in 2025. This also makes it one of the largest in all of Skåne County. In the same year, there were additionally around 100 research and development employees in Linköping and 30 in Stockholm.

== Sustainability ==
In 2025, Axis Communications began to structure its sustainability reports according to the European Sustainability Reporting Standards (ESRS) required by the EU Corporate Sustainability Reporting Directive, with the aim of full compliance when the directive becomes applicable. The company states that "almost all" its products are free from PVC.

Axis Communications signed the UN Global Compact in 2007.

== Technology ==
=== Network cameras ===
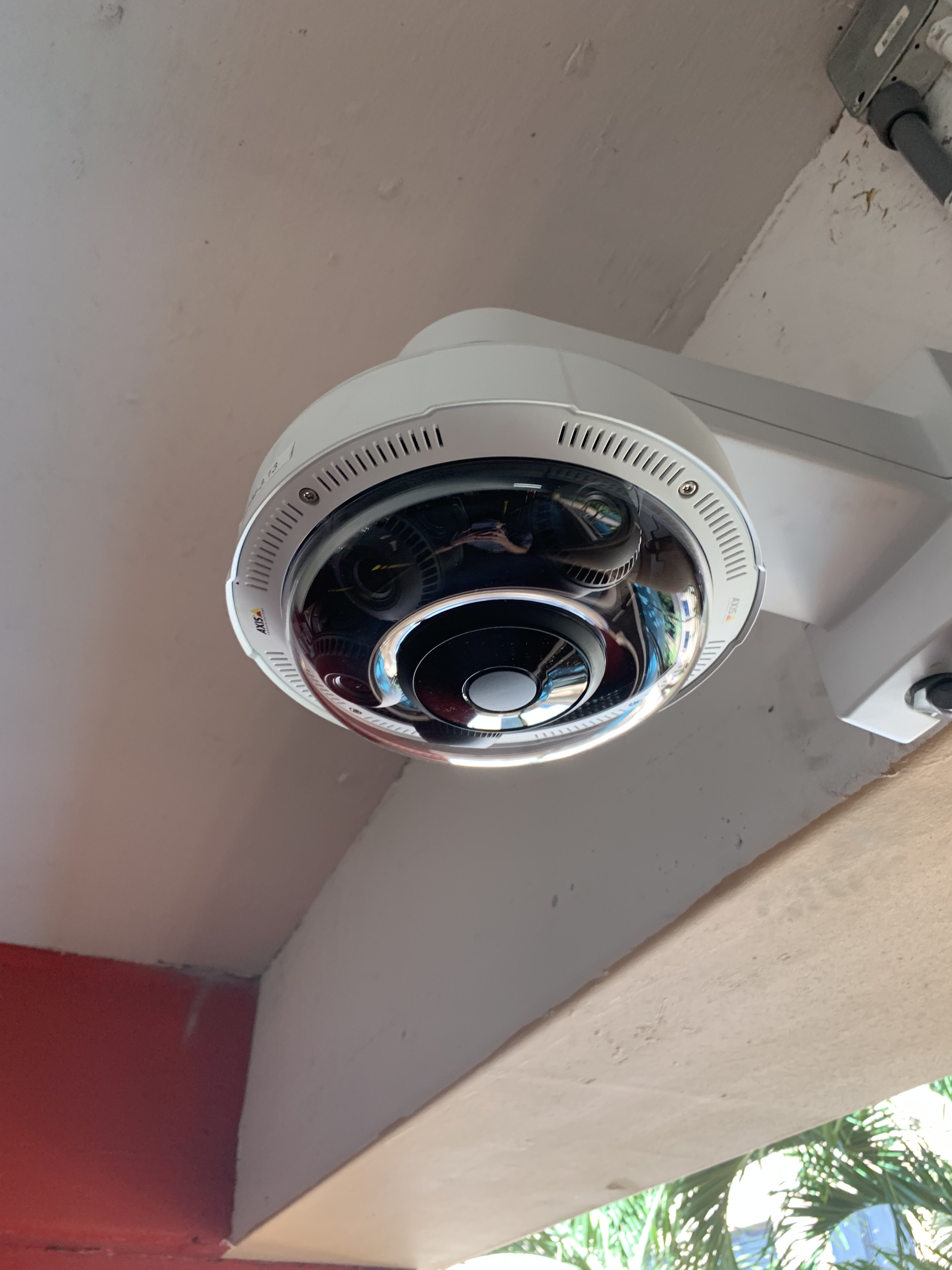
AXIS P3717 with 4 sensors and 360° coverage

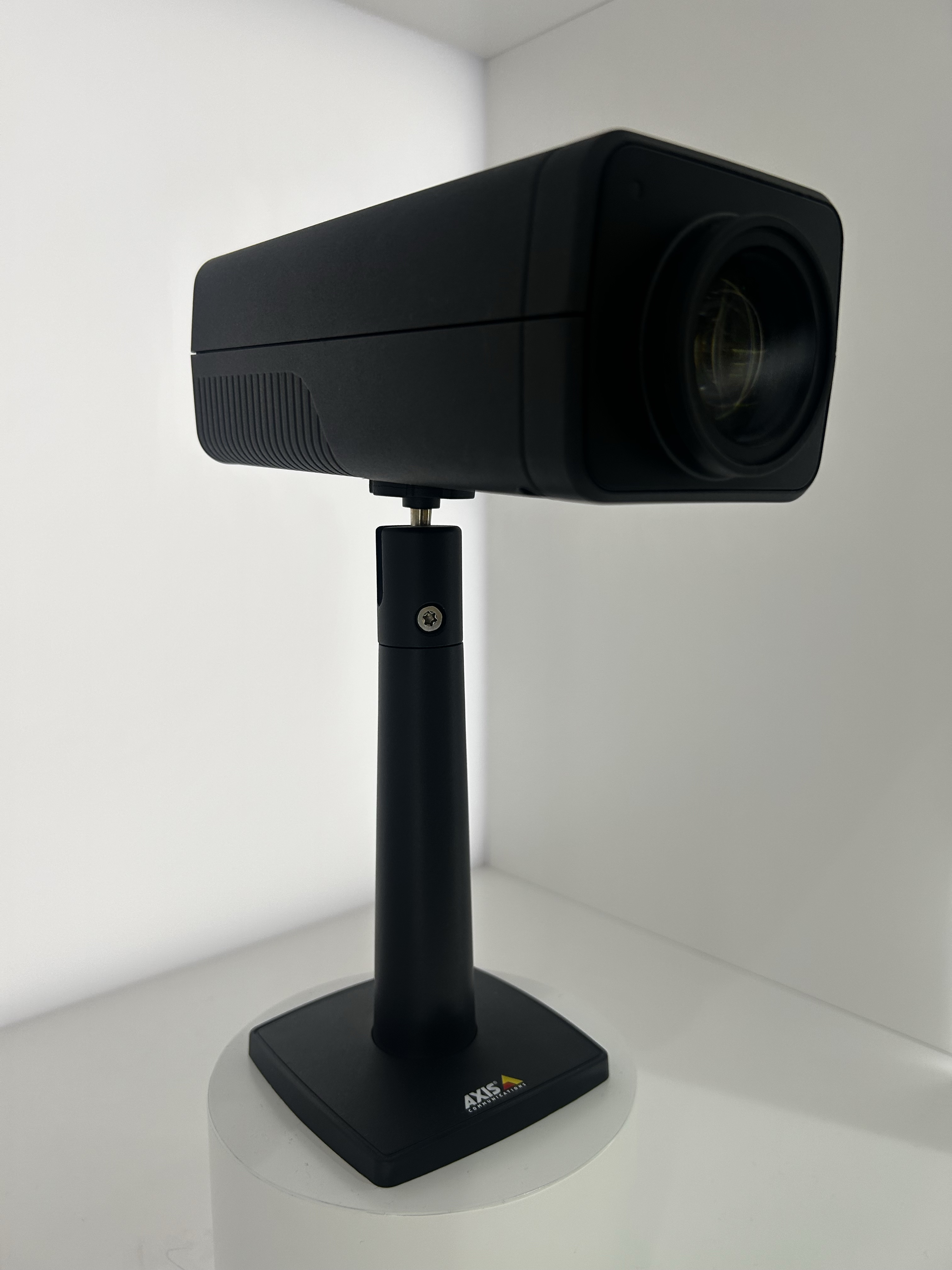
AXIS 1715 block camera

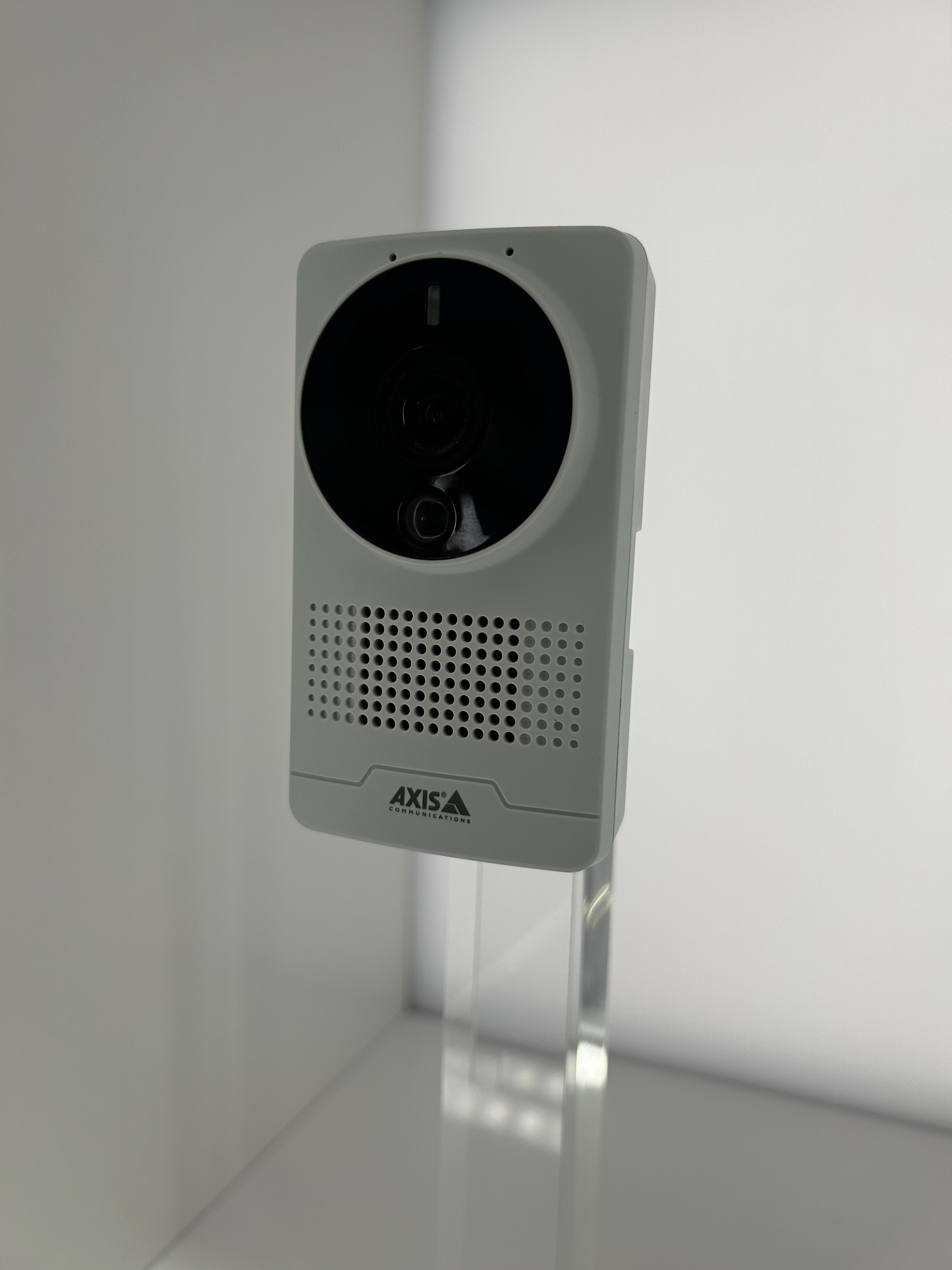
AXIS M1075-L box camera

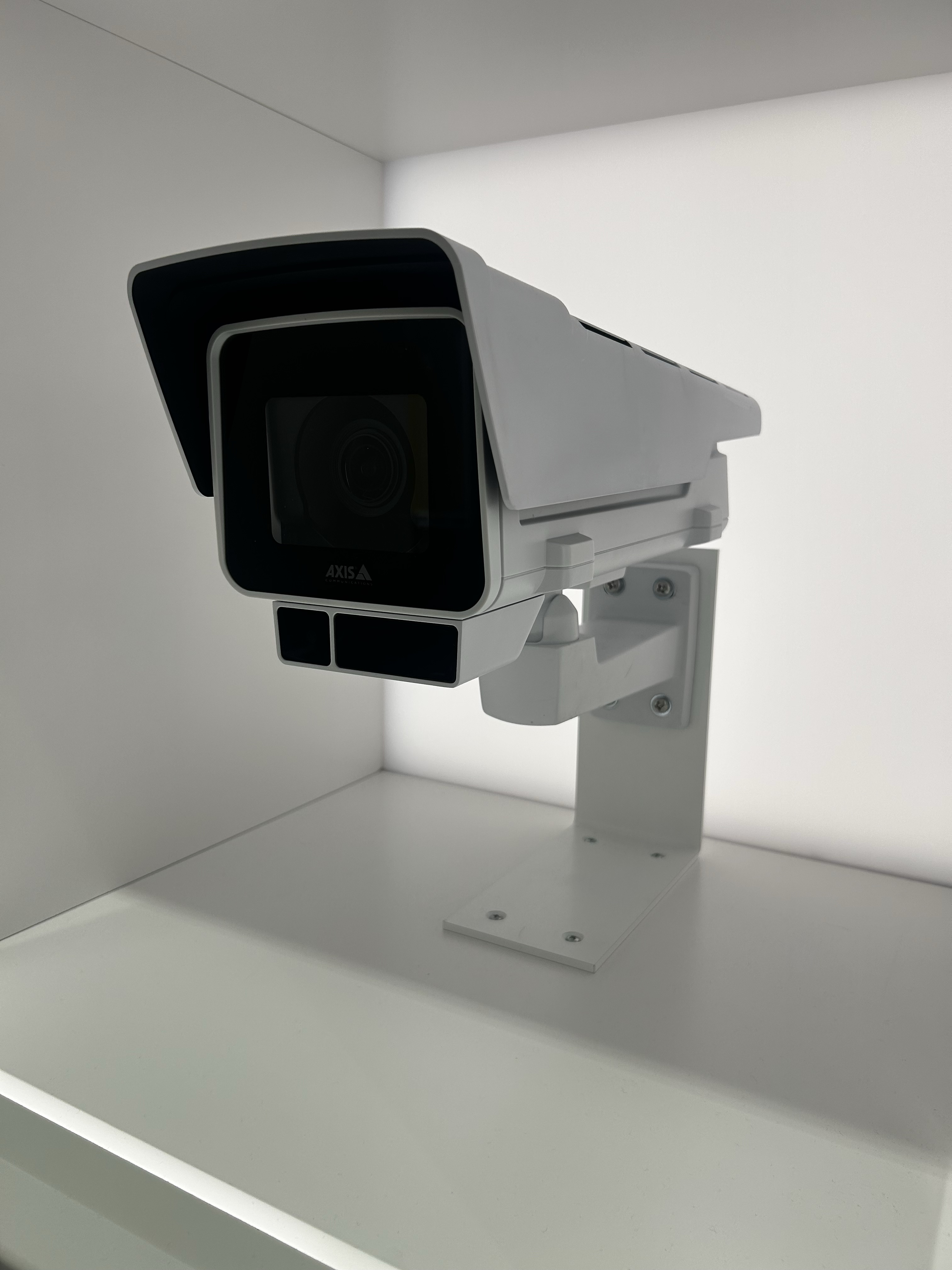
AXIS P1388-LE box camera

Axis Communications produces network cameras of a number of different types, such as box cameras, bullet cameras, dome cameras, explosion-protected cameras, modular cameras, onboard cameras, panoramic cameras, pan-tilt-zoom (PTZ) cameras and thermal cameras. The company launched the world's first network camera in 1996, the world's first commercially available HDTV network camera in 2008 and the world's first commercially available thermal network camera in 2010. In 2022, the company released network cameras that can connect to Z-Wave devices.

Network cameras is a category where the use of edge AI, applications of artificial intelligence that run locally on a device, increases rapidly. Sending video data to the cloud for processing is often too slow when the aim is to trigger immediate action if irregularities are detected. Most Axis cameras have built-in video content analysis capabilities, such as advanced motion detection. Higher-end cameras support artificial intelligence for video surveillance applications, which can classify objects and human behavior.

=== Physical access control ===
Axis Communications began offering physical access control systems in 2013 with the introduction of network door controllers and RFID card readers. The devices offer an open interface for integration with other IP-based security system components and third-party software. The first product was the AXIS A1001 network door controller, which was also the first ONVIF-conformant physical access control device available on the market.

=== Network audio ===
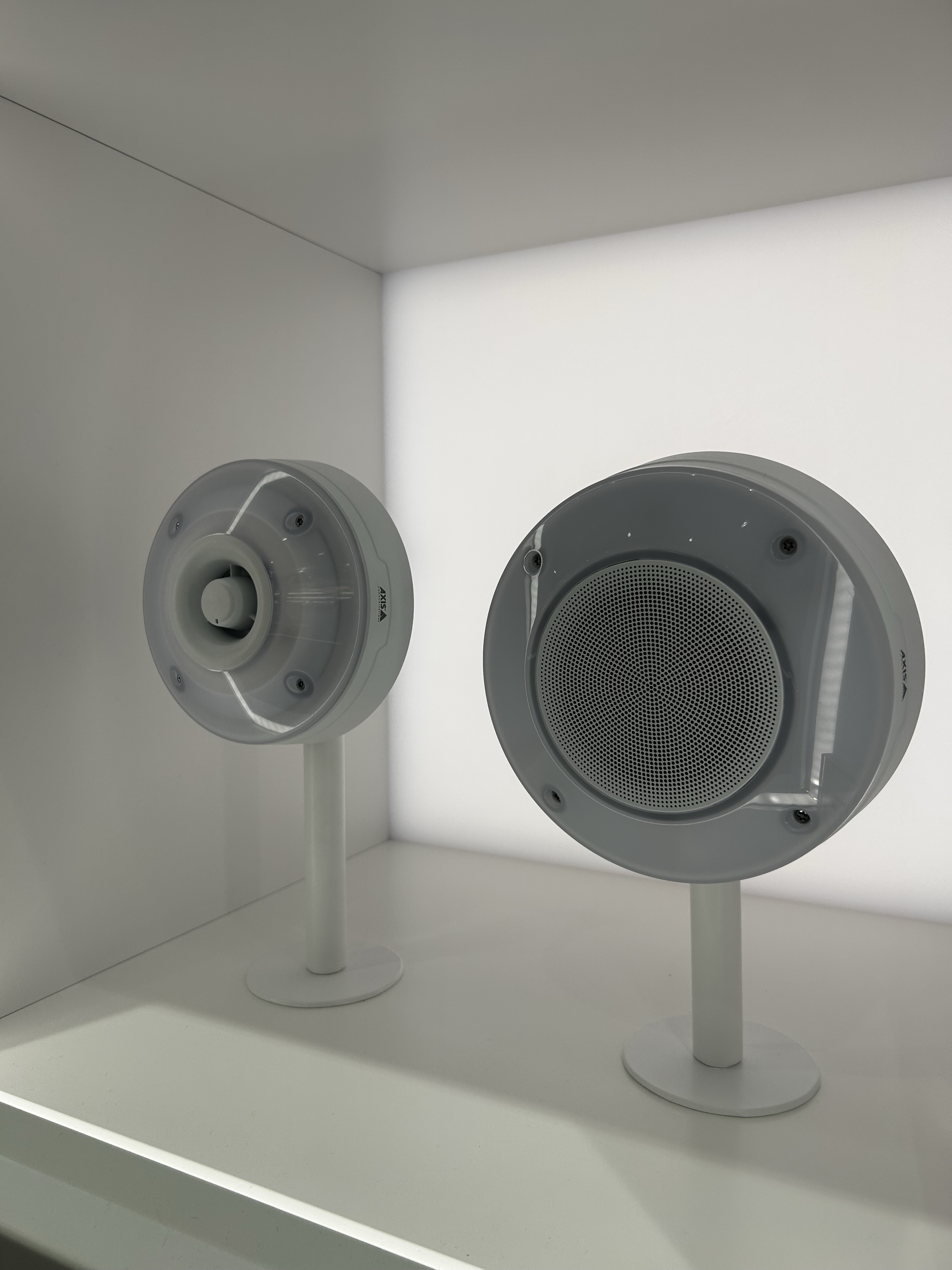
AXIS D4200-VE network strobe speaker and AXIS D4100-VE MK II network strobe siren

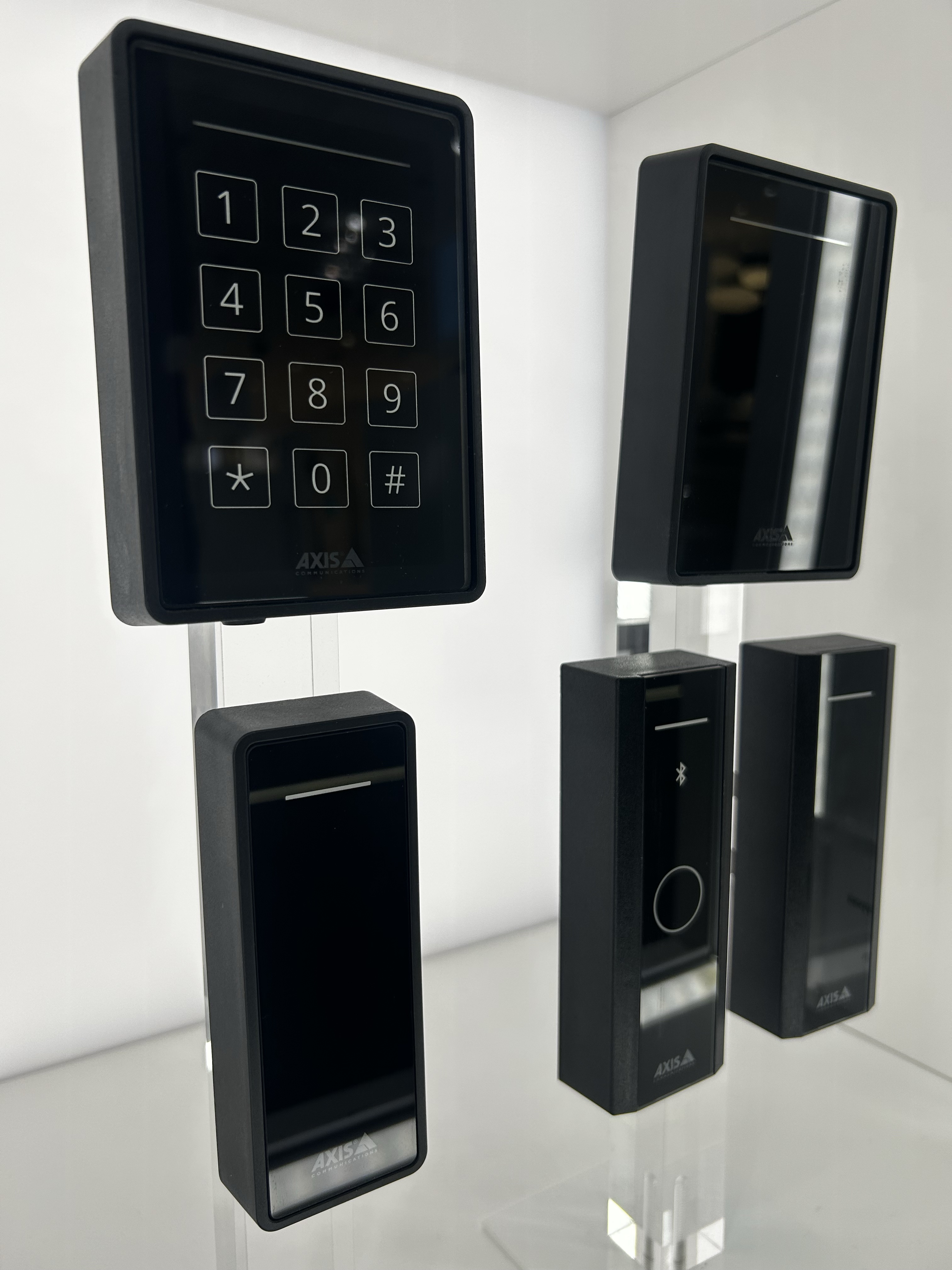
Access control devices

In 2015, Axis Communications introduced its first network audio product, a horn speaker providing talk-down audio functionality for security applications. Subsequently, the company has launched network loudspeakers, sound projectors, strobe sirens, intercoms, and analog-to-IP audio converters for use in public address (PA) systems. A selection of network audio products are made for outdoor use and are vandal-resistant.

=== Intercoms ===
Axis Communications produces intercom devices that are network-connected and provide video surveillance, two-way communication and remote entry control using many of the same technologies as the company's network cameras. Some of these products are sold under the subsidiary 2N brand that was acquired in 2016.

=== Radar ===
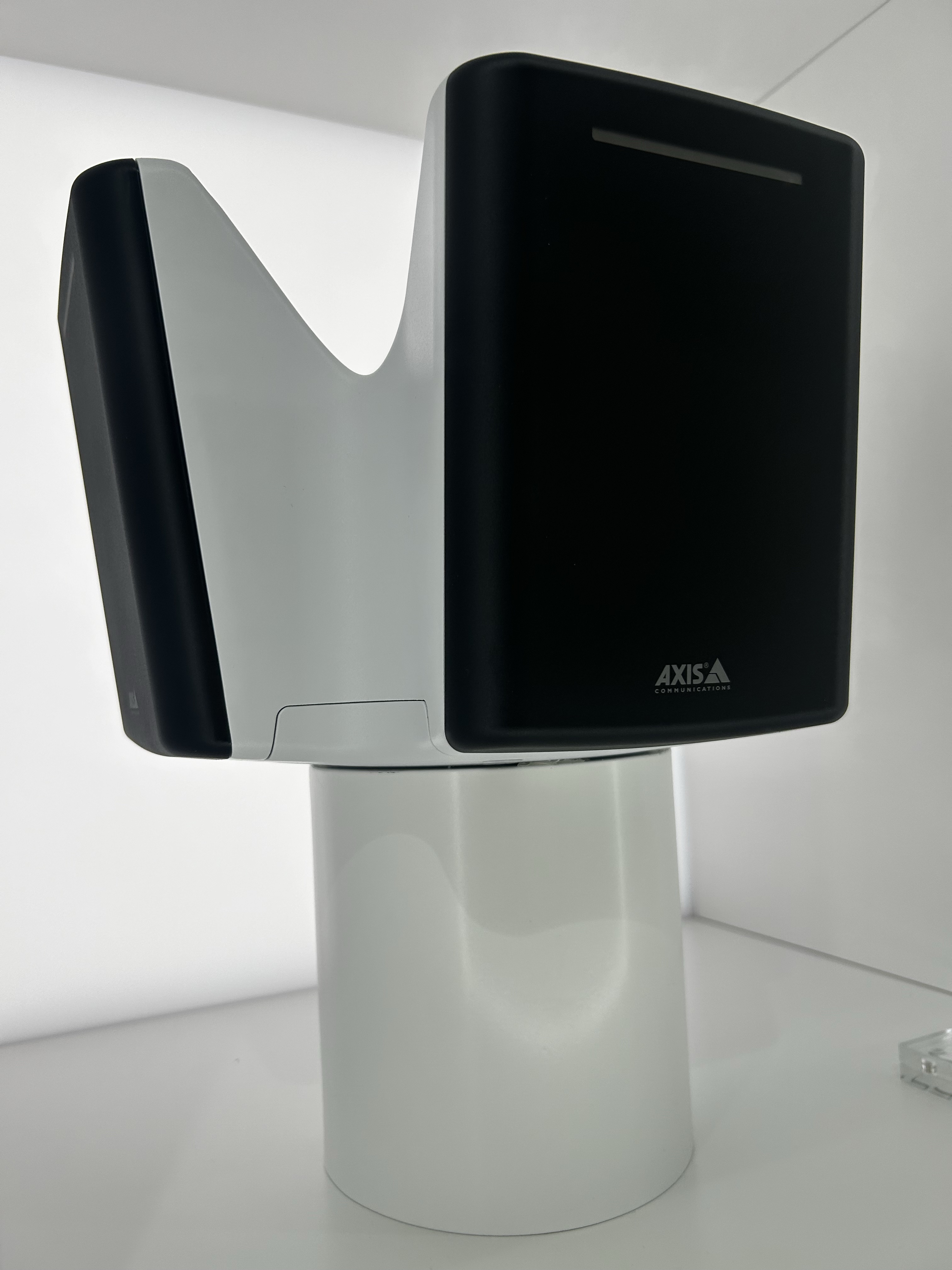
AXIS D2123-VE radar

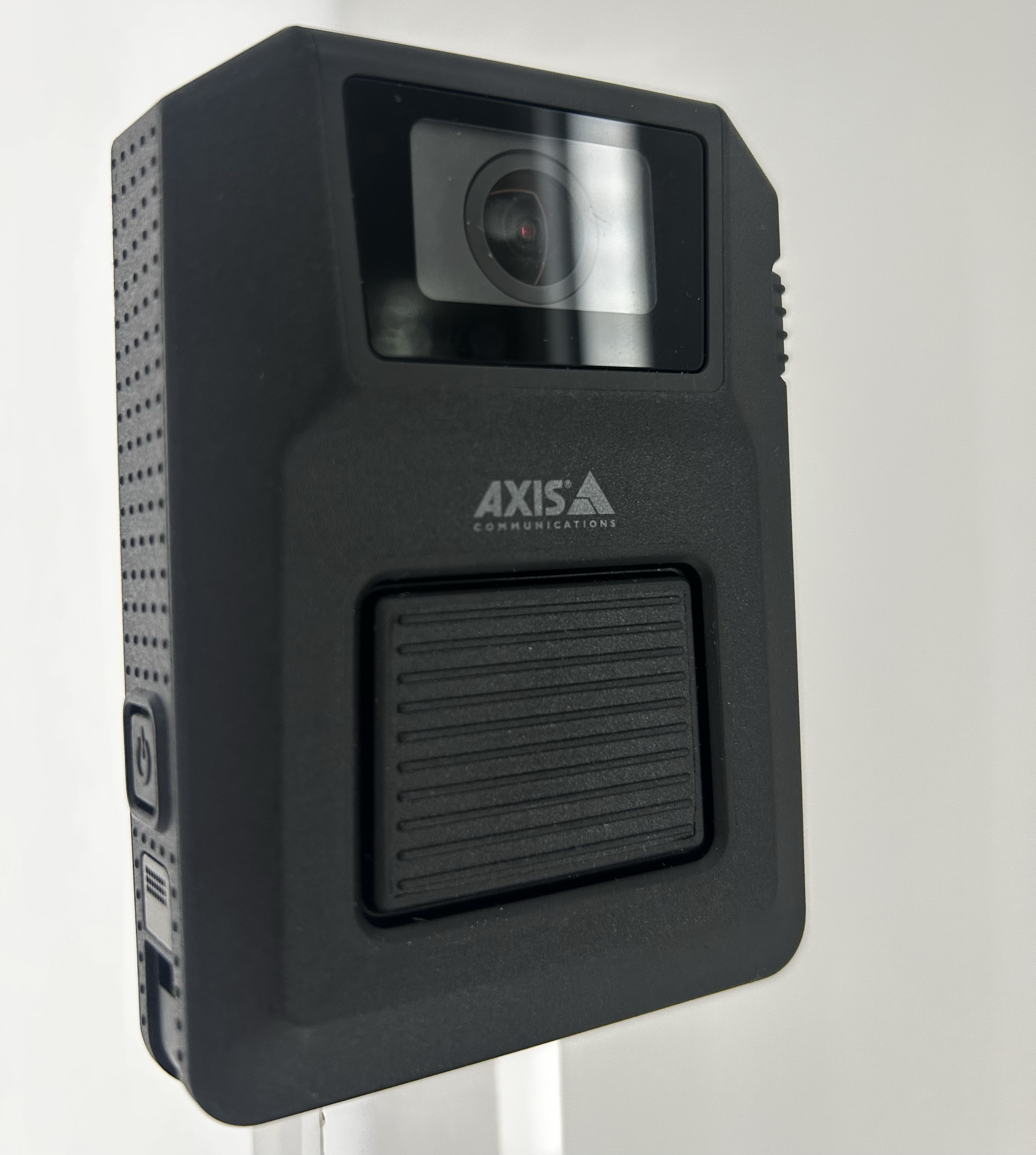
AXIS W102 body-worn camera

In 2017, Axis Communications launched its first network radar, which minimizes false alarms, can classify objects, and adds advanced auto-tracking capabilities to Axis PTZ cameras. The network radars utilize machine learning and deep learning algorithms to classify objects and identify behavior. The radars are designed for outdoor use and are vandal-resistant.

=== Body cameras ===
In 2020, Axis Communications entered the body camera market, competing with market incumbents Axon, Digital Ally, Wolfcom and Motorola Solutions.

=== Environmental sensors ===
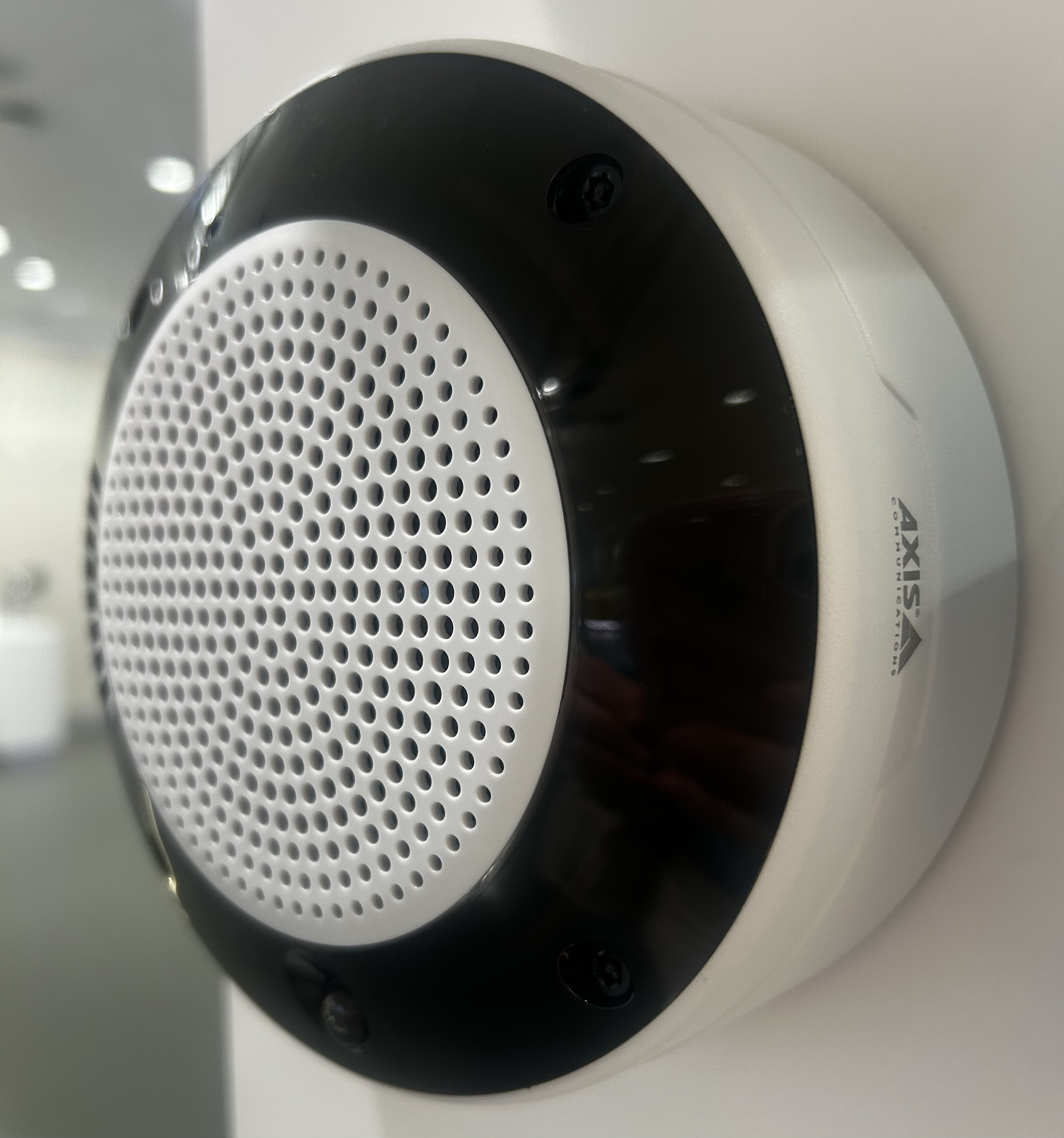
AXIS D6310 air quality sensor

In 2025, Axis Communications introduced network-connected environmental sensors that monitor air quality parameters like temperature, humidity, CO₂, NOx, particles of several sizes and VOC. Examples of applications are ventilation management, automated environmental alerts and detection of smoking and vaping.

=== Video encoders ===
Axis Communications is a manufacturer of video encoders, which allow analog video signals to be converted into digital format for IP networks. The capabilities include H.264, H.265 and Zipstream video compression as well as analog HD support. The company offers compact encoders, as well as rack-mountable systems for large installations.

=== Lightfinder ===
Axis Lightfinder refers to a set of technologies used in some Axis network cameras to improve image capture in low-light conditions. The technology combines image sensor characteristics, lens properties, processing hardware, and software algorithms to improve color reproduction and reduce motion blur in low-light environments. Applications include monitoring areas such as construction sites and parking lots. The first Axis Lightfinder product was the AXIS Q1602 network camera, released in 2011.

=== Video analytics ===
As of 2026, Axis Communications network cameras can perform image analysis on the device. This enables functions such as generating alerts, adding video metadata, and modifying the video stream in real time. Applications include human, face, and vehicle detection, privacy masking, perimeter protection, license plate recognition, and retail analytics. In 2009, Axis introduced the Axis Camera Application Platform (ACAP), an API for deploying first- and third-party applications on Axis devices.

=== Video management software ===
AXIS Camera Station is the video management software developed by Axis Communications. It supports video monitoring and recording and includes modules for access control, video search, audio management, event management, and third-party integrations through an API.

=== Zipstream ===
Axis Zipstream is a video compression technology introduced in 2015 for the ARTPEC-5 and later chip generations. It is designed for surveillance video and is compatible with compression standards such as H.264, H.265, and AV1. The technology adjusts compression based on image content to reduce bandwidth and storage requirements. When the technology was introduced, Axis reported an average reduction in bandwidth and storage requirements of 50%.

Zipstream analyzes and adjusts the video stream in real time using concepts such as Region of Interest (ROI) and Group of Pictures (GOP). Areas containing details such as faces and license plates are assigned higher image quality, while lower-priority areas such as walls and vegetation can be compressed more heavily. Later updates added support for PTZ camera movements and frame-rate-based adjustments to the video stream bit rate.

=== Microprocessors ===
The Axis Real-Time Picture Encoder Chip (ARTPEC) is a system on a chip (SoC) developed by Axis Communications. There are currently nine generations of the chip, all of which run AXIS OS, a modified version of Linux designed for embedded devices. Not all products developed by Axis Communications use its custom chip. The chip is typically found in high-performance devices such as higher-end cameras, while lower-cost devices use SoCs from Ambarella.

List of SoCs developed
Release year	Name	CPU	Features
1999	ARTPEC-1	ETRAX CRIS	Runs μClinux, an embedded operating system which became known as Embedded Linux
2003	ARTPEC-2	ETRAX CRIS	Combined digital signal processor and CPU into one package Hardware accelerated MPEG-4 video encoding
2007	ARTPEC-3	ETRAX CRIS	Hardware accelerated H.264 video encoding Capable of capturing 1080P video at 30 frames per second
2011	ARTPEC-4	Multi-threaded MIPS CPU (34Kc)	Implements Lightfinder, a technology that allows a camera to see color in low light or challenging light conditions
2013	ARTPEC-5	Dual-core MIPS CPU (1004Kf)	Implements Forensic Capture, a High Dynamic Range technology that increases forensic details in a scene Implements Video encoders that utilize a technology called Zipstream to reduce bandwidth while maintaining video quality and detail
2017	ARTPEC-6	ARM Cortex-A9	Can run video analytics capable of identifying objects such as humans and cars Capable of capturing 4K video at 30 frames per second
2019	ARTPEC-7	ARM Cortex-A9	Implements a machine learning processor Hardware accelerated H.265 video encoding Implements secure boot, which prevents booting of unauthorized firmware Improves low-light imaging via a technology called Lightfinder 2.0
2021	ARTPEC-8	ARM Cortex-A53	Implements a deep learning processor Can run video analytics that recognize various object characteristics such as clothing
2024	ARTPEC-9	ARM Cortex-A55	Hardware accelerated AV1 video encoding Faster deep learning processor capable of identifying more object characteristics

== Cybersecurity vulnerabilities ==
In July 2017, cyber security researchers found a vulnerability in the gSOAP code library. All ONVIF-compatible products were affected, including those produced by Axis Communications.

In October 2021, cybersecurity research firm Nozomi Networks published "three new vulnerabilities (CVE-2021-31986, CVE-2021-31987, CVE-2021-31988) affecting all Axis devices based on the embedded AXIS OS." Axis and Nozomi collaborated throughout the research and disclosure process.

== See also ==
- IP video surveillance
- Megapixel
- Image sensor
- Professional video over IP
- Closed-circuit television (CCTV)
- Closed-circuit television camera
- Video Analytics
- ONVIF
- Physical security
