= Combination car =

Combination car may refer to:

- Combination car (ambulance), a road vehicle intended to serve as both an ambulance and a hearse
- Combination car (railroad), a rail vehicle intended to carry both freight and passengers, more often called a combine car
- Combination car (tram), a tram or streetcar with separate open and closed compartments, intended for smokers and non-smokers respectively

See also

- Combination bus
