= Permutation (disambiguation) =

In mathematics, permutation relates to the act of arranging all the members of a set into some sequence or order.

Permutation may also refer to:

== Computing ==
- Permutation (Cryptography), a series of linked mathematical operations used in block cipher algorithms such as AES
- Permutation box, a cryptography method of bit shuffling used to permute or transpose bits across S-boxes

== Music ==
- Permutation (music), as a concept related to musical set theory
- Permutation (Amon Tobin album), 1998
- Permutation (Bill Laswell album), 1999
- "Permutation" (song), an instrumental song by the Red Hot Chili Peppers

== Other uses ==
- Permutation test in statistics
- An alteration or transformation of a previous object or concept; see iteration
