= COMBO =

French artist

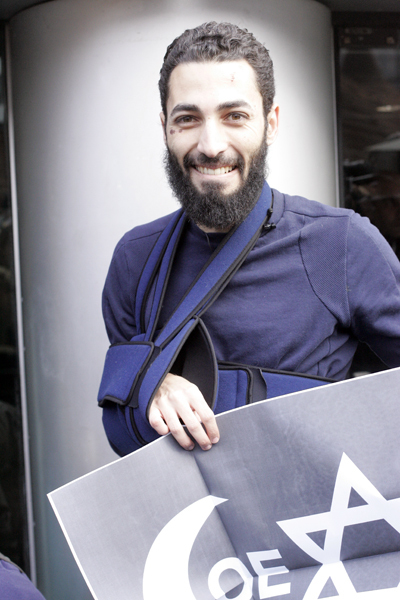
- Combo Culture Kidnapper.jpg
- Movement: Graffiti Art, Street Art

COMBO, or COMBO Culture Kidnapper, is a French street artist who started by doing graffiti art in 2003 in the South of France. After seven years spent painting from Monaco to Marseille, he moved to Paris in 2010 and became an art director at a major advertising agency. Putting his spray paint cans aside, he then started doing wheat paste.

Combo's work focuses around culture and visual jamming, as illustrated by his cartoon series^{,} in which he manipulates iconic pictures, replacing some elements by others taken from the comics or the video games universe to change these pictures' meaning according to what he wants to express.

By appealing to Generation Y’s pop culture, Combo hits his target at heart and takes it back to the unfairness that makes our world - whether cultural, financial or identity-related.

Combo was "savagely beaten" by "four youths" on 30 January 2015 and suffered a dislocated shoulder after he painted a wall at Porte Dorée near Paris with the word "coexist" written with letters created from religious symbols.

== Technique ==
The majority of COMBO's work is made of wheat pasted prints that he unpastes and then pastes back on canvas, giving it a true street feel. Whatever their size and as an advertiser would do, he always manages to get his work to be seen by as many people as possible.

== Career ==
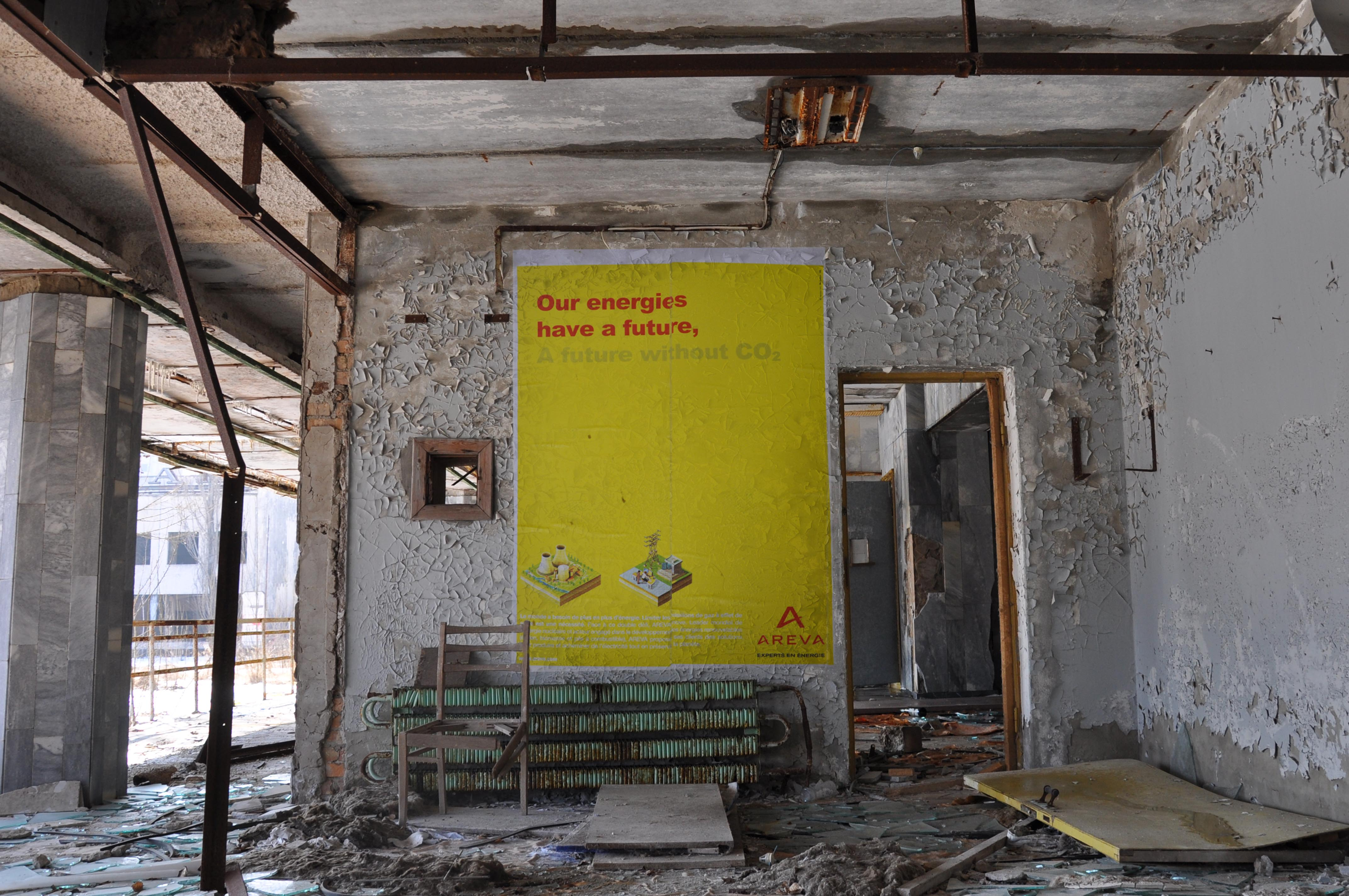

Committed street artist, COMBO was noticed by the media in 2012 when he introduced himself in the Chernobyl Exclusion Zone to paste up real advertisements that vaunted the nuclear industry - his way to celebrate Fukushima's disaster first birthday. Strongly influenced by the cartoon and the video game universe, he also created a massive Simpsons mural, where "America's beloved animated family seems to be having a great time, picnicking on a grassy mound, all while Homer's nuclear power plant is seen menacingly in the background"^{,}. The Simpsons piece, though, has somehow been the only one that international media relayed.

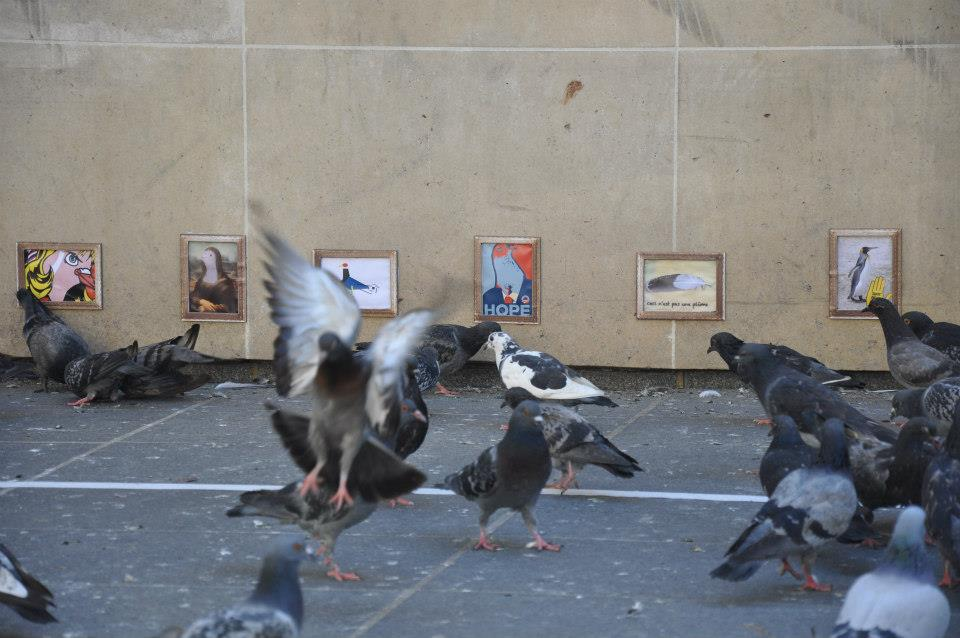
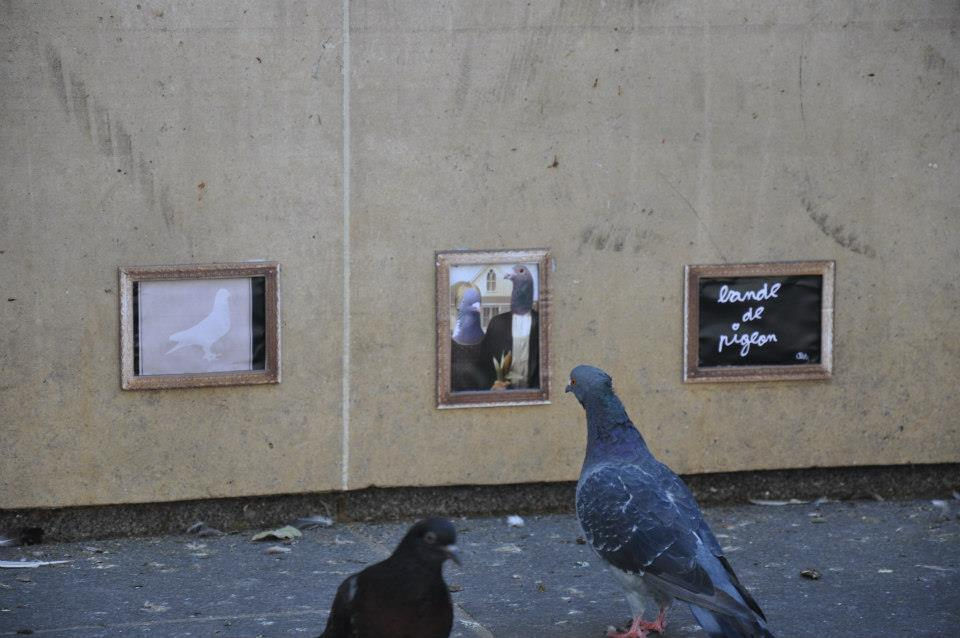

In September 2012, he set up an exhibit for pigeons right in front of the Centre Georges Pompidou in Paris, and hung about twenty of the most famous art pieces - that he would obviously have hijacked first - at eyes-height of the birds.

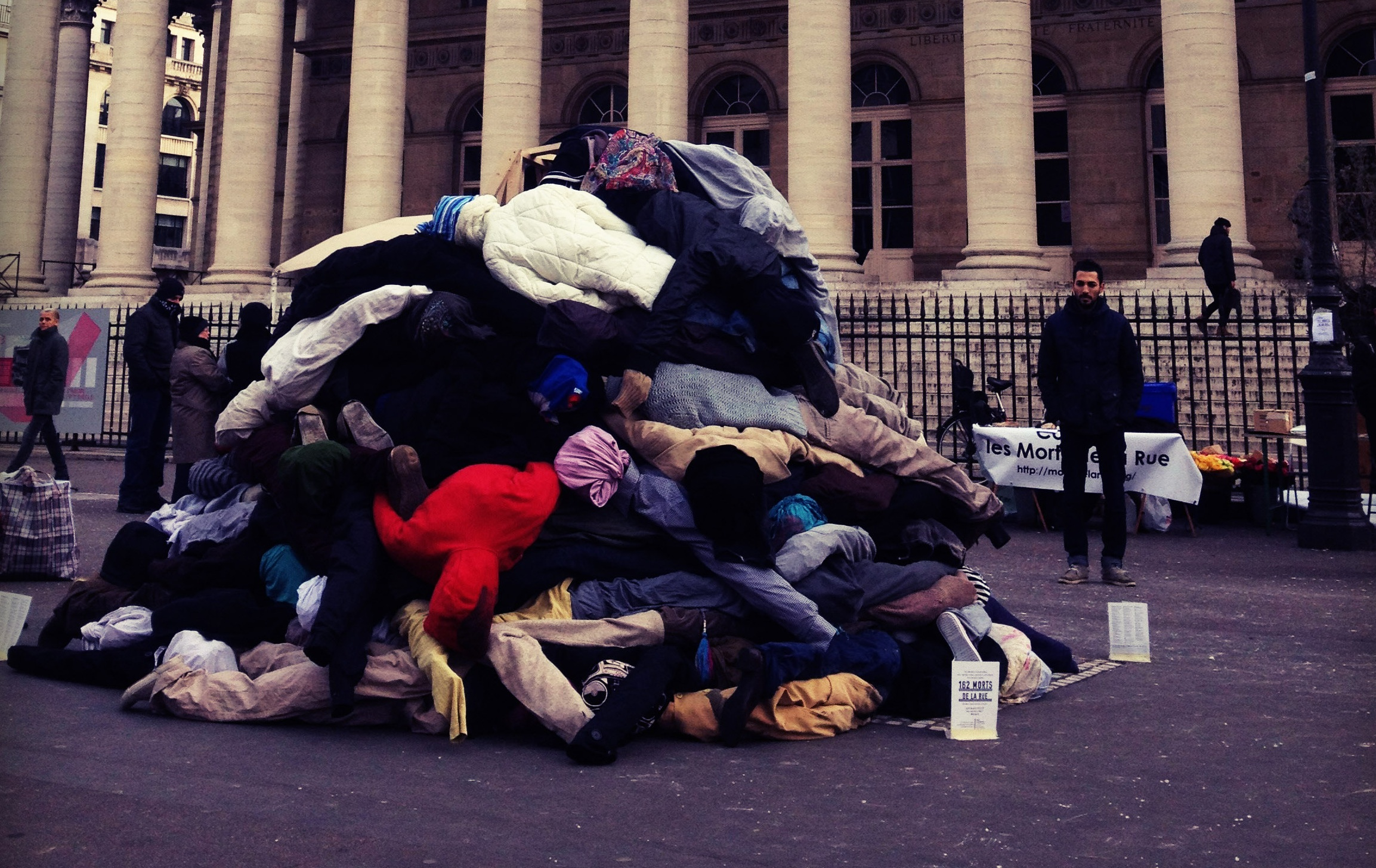
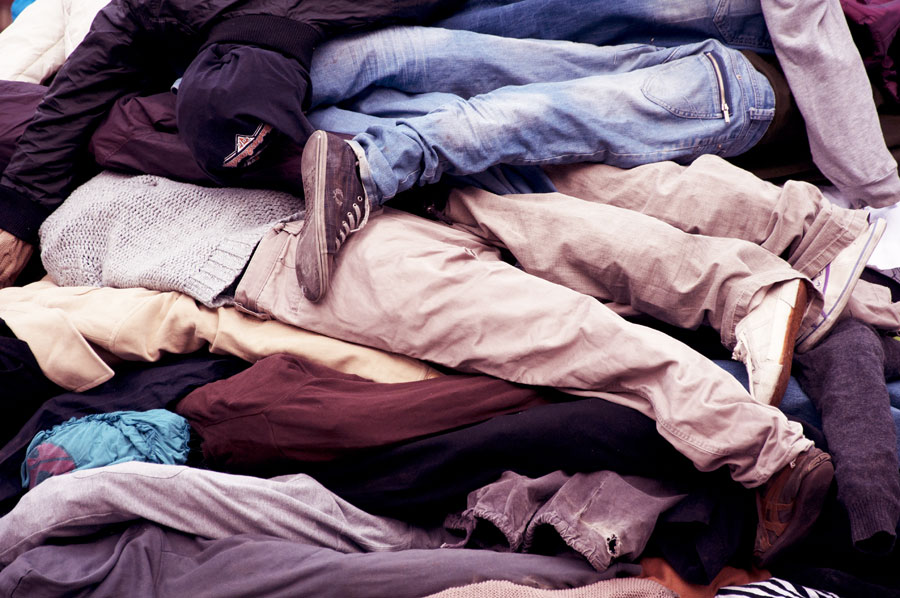

Early December, COMBO collaborated with other street artists and realized a pop-up installation place de la Bourse in the 2nd arrondissement, minutes away from AFP's headquarters, to pay a tribute to the 162 homeless persons who died in the street over the six previous months.

In January 2013 he struck again in China, where he went to denunciate Google's decision to definitively give up on getting its service back to mainland China. It's in the streets of Hong Kong that he chose to put his work out, giving a second life to the most recognizable Google pages censored by the Party: Tiananmen Square protests, Ai Weiwei’s recent arrest, Tibet… An initiative that led to his first solo exhibit in Paris: Golden Shield, as per the other name of the « Great Firewall of China ».

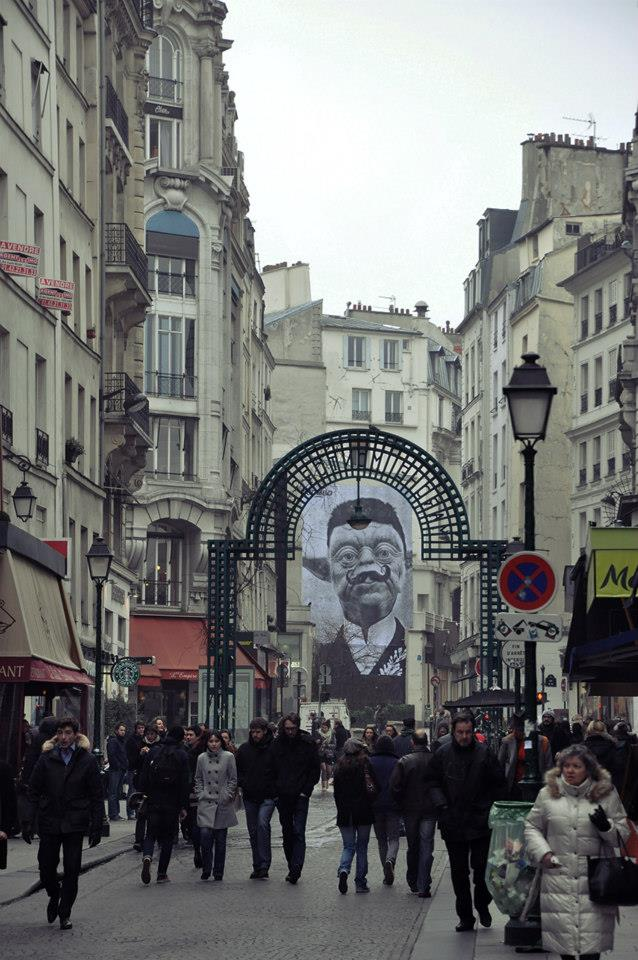

Late Spring, COMBO came back to Paris and settled down in the rue des Petits-Carreaux for his second exhibit, getting a lot of attention both from the neighborhood and the Internets by pasting up a +30 ft. high portrait of a dandy version of Yoda. As opposed to most of his projects since Chernobyl, Old-Up didn't have any political dimension, allowing him to get back to his roots: cartoon.

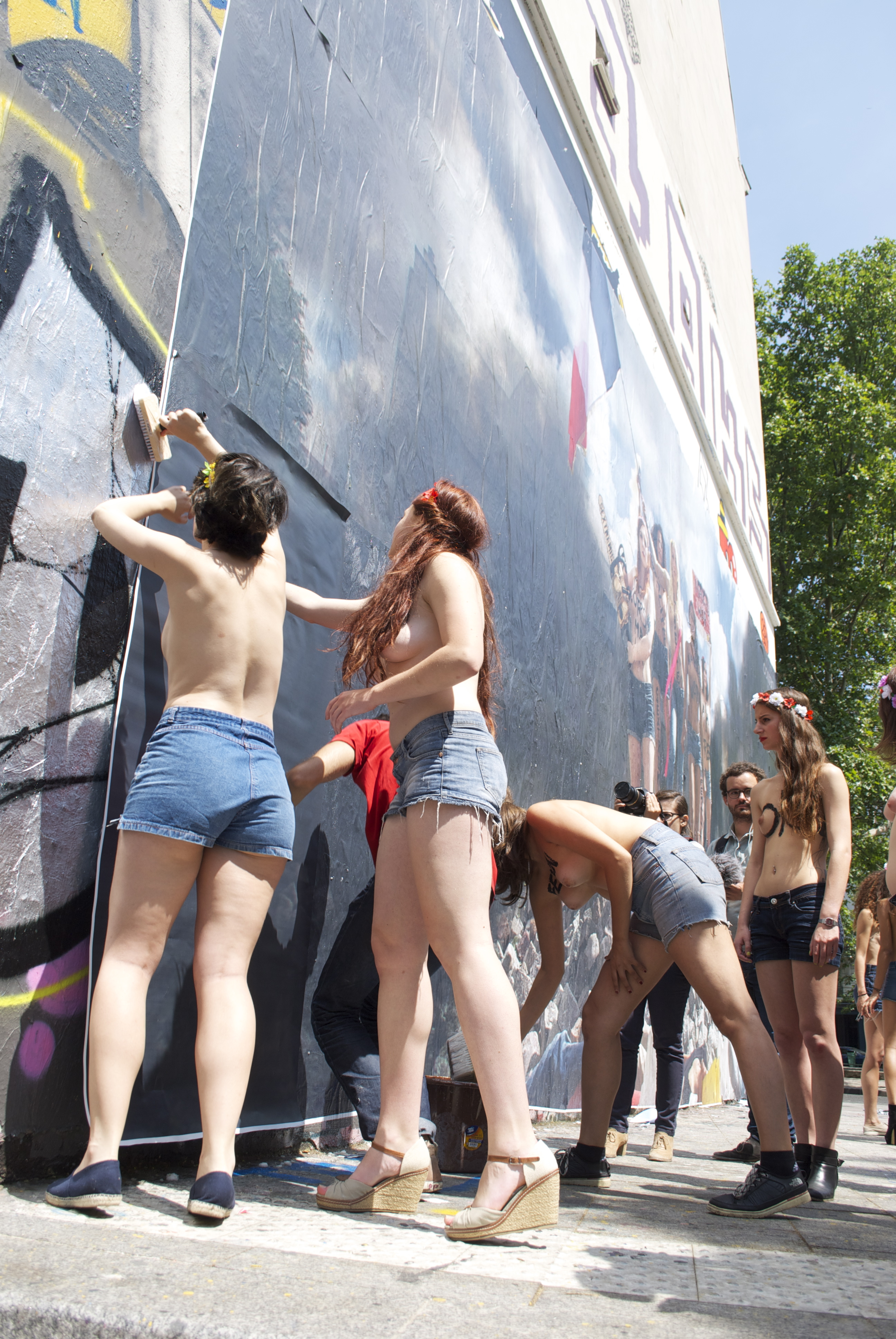

Finally, on July 14th and to celebrate Bastille Day he pasted up a massive collage on the banks of the Canal Saint-Martin in Paris, realized in association with the Femen - a feminist protest group founded in Ukraine in 2008 and now operating out of Paris. The piece consisted in a reinterpretation of Liberty leading the people by Delacroix, in which it is not the Jacobins but women who march towards their freedom. By jamming such an iconic piece of art, COMBO not only intended to pay a tribute to the activists’ fight, but also to denunciate the discrimination and other misogynistic behavior women still suffer too often nowadays.
