= Kombo-Idinti =

Commune and arrondissement in Southwest Province, Cameroon

- arrondissement
- Location within Cameroon
- Coordinates: 4.6467°N 8.7629°E
- Country: Cameroon; Ambazonia
- Province: Southwest Province
- Department: Ndian

Kombo-Itindi is a commune and arrondissement in the Ndian département, Southwest Province, western Cameroon.
