= Combine =

Combine may refer to:

== Machinery ==
- Combine harvester, or combine, a machine to harvest grain crops
- Seed drill, or combine seeder, a machine to plant seeds

== Company structure ==
- Corporate group, an industrial business group in Western democracies
- Combine (enterprise), an industrial business group in socialist countries, particularly the former Soviet Union

== Places ==
- Combine, Texas, U.S.

== Sports ==
- A sports combine, an event held by certain professional sports leagues to evaluate prospective players, such as:
  - AFL Draft Combine in Australian rules football
  - CFL Combine in Canadian football
  - NBA draft combine in basketball
  - NFL Scouting Combine in American football
  - NHL draft combine in North American ice hockey

== Other ==
- Combine car, or combine, a type of railroad car which combines sections for passengers and freight
- Combine painting, a type of artwork
- COMBINE, a computational biology initiative
- Combine (Half-Life), a fictional alien enemy force from the Half-Life video game series
- The Combine (group), an organized crime group
- The Combine (Australian film industry)
- Combine Music Group, a defunct music publisher

== See also ==
- Combination (disambiguation)
- Combined (disambiguation)
- Combiner
- CombineZ, image processing software
- Merge (disambiguation)
- Unite (disambiguation)
