= Striking combination =

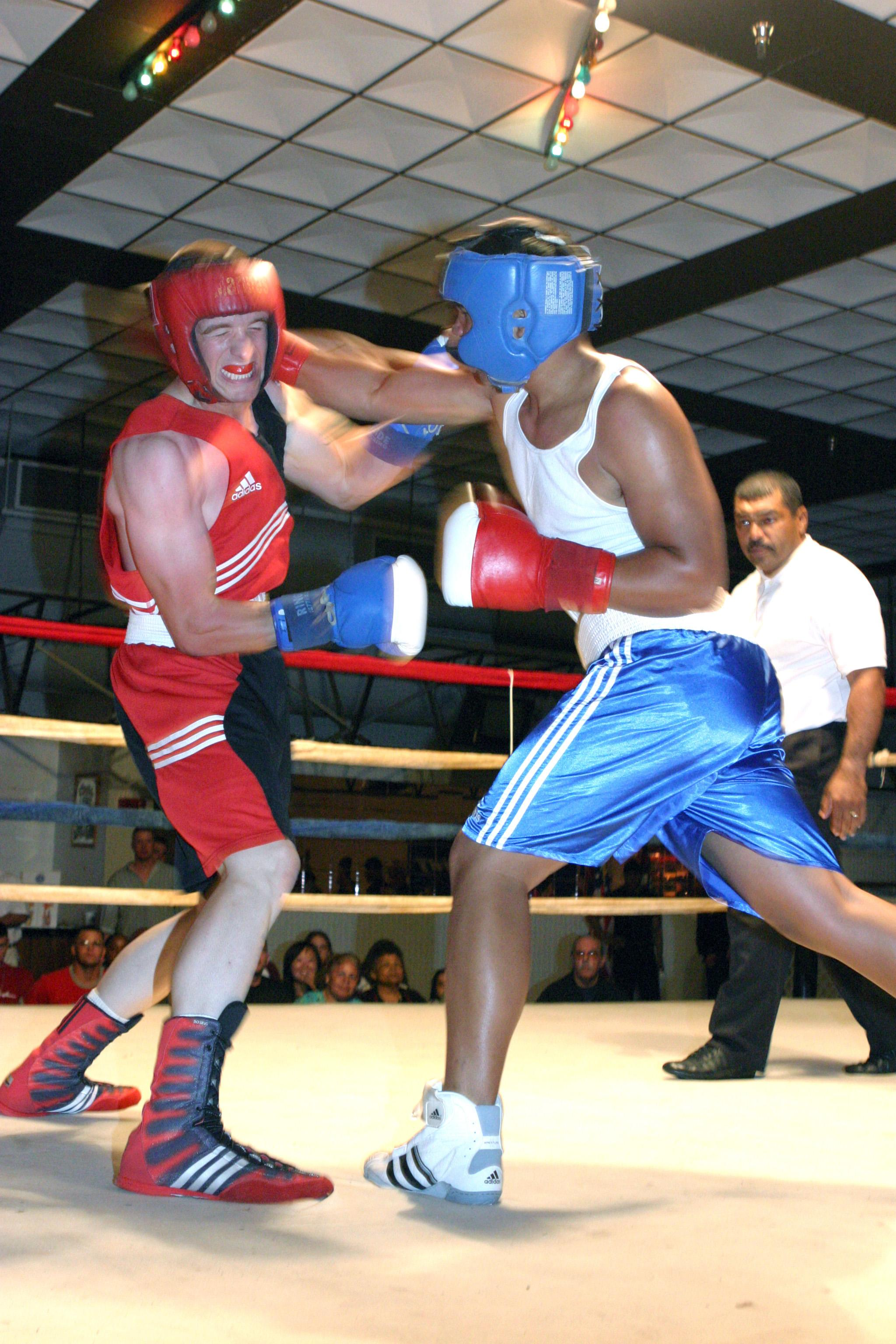
Punching combinations are an essential part of boxing.

A striking combination (generally referred to as a combination or "combo") is a combination of strikes performed rapidly, usually from a stand-up position. If the combination includes only punches, it is called a punching combination, and if it includes only kicks, it is called a kicking combination.

Popular striking combinations consist of punches which allow the fighter to shift weight from one leg to the other in a natural rhythm.
