= Door phone =

Electronic entry intercom system

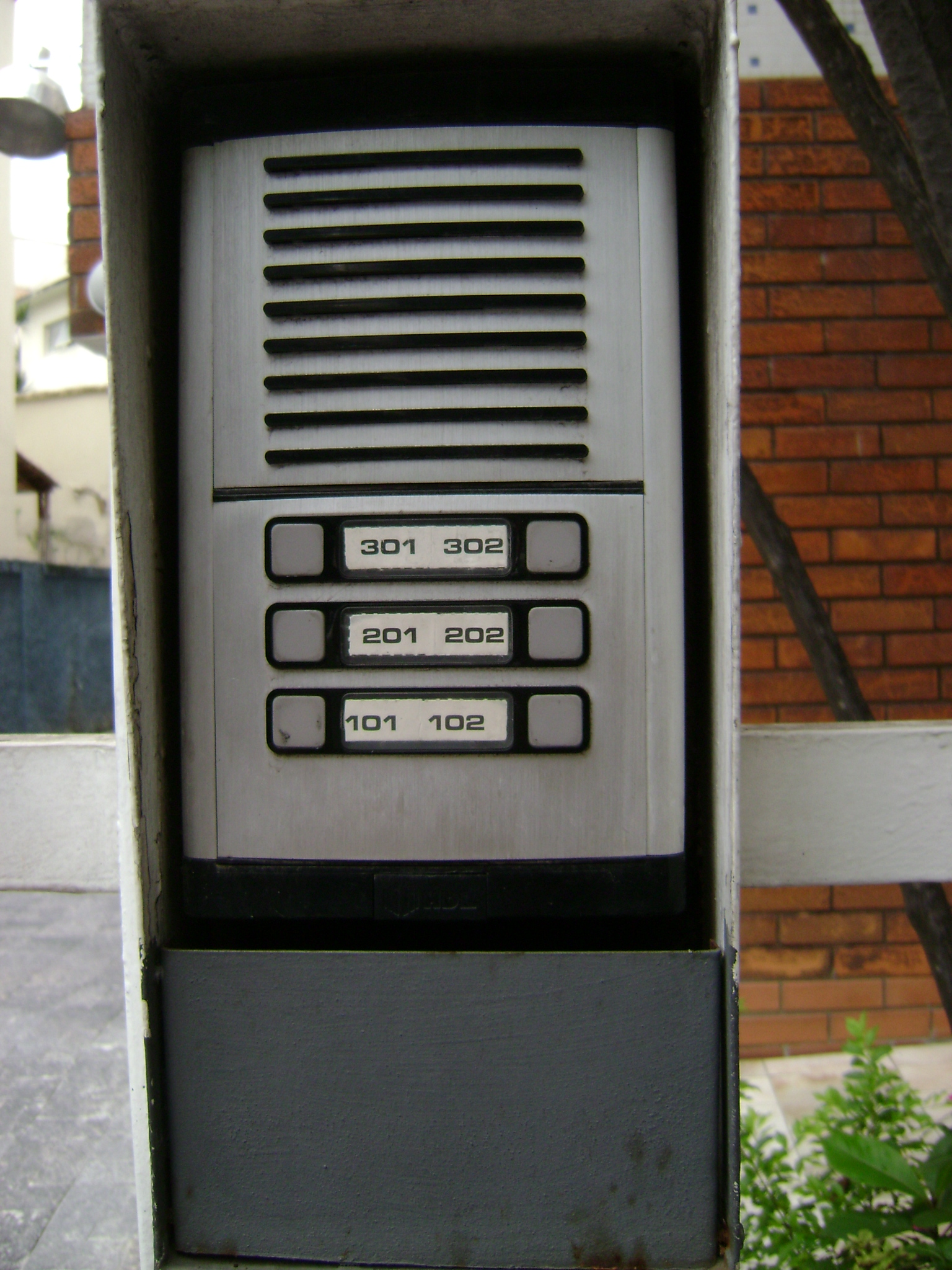
Outdoor phone plate at the building's entrance

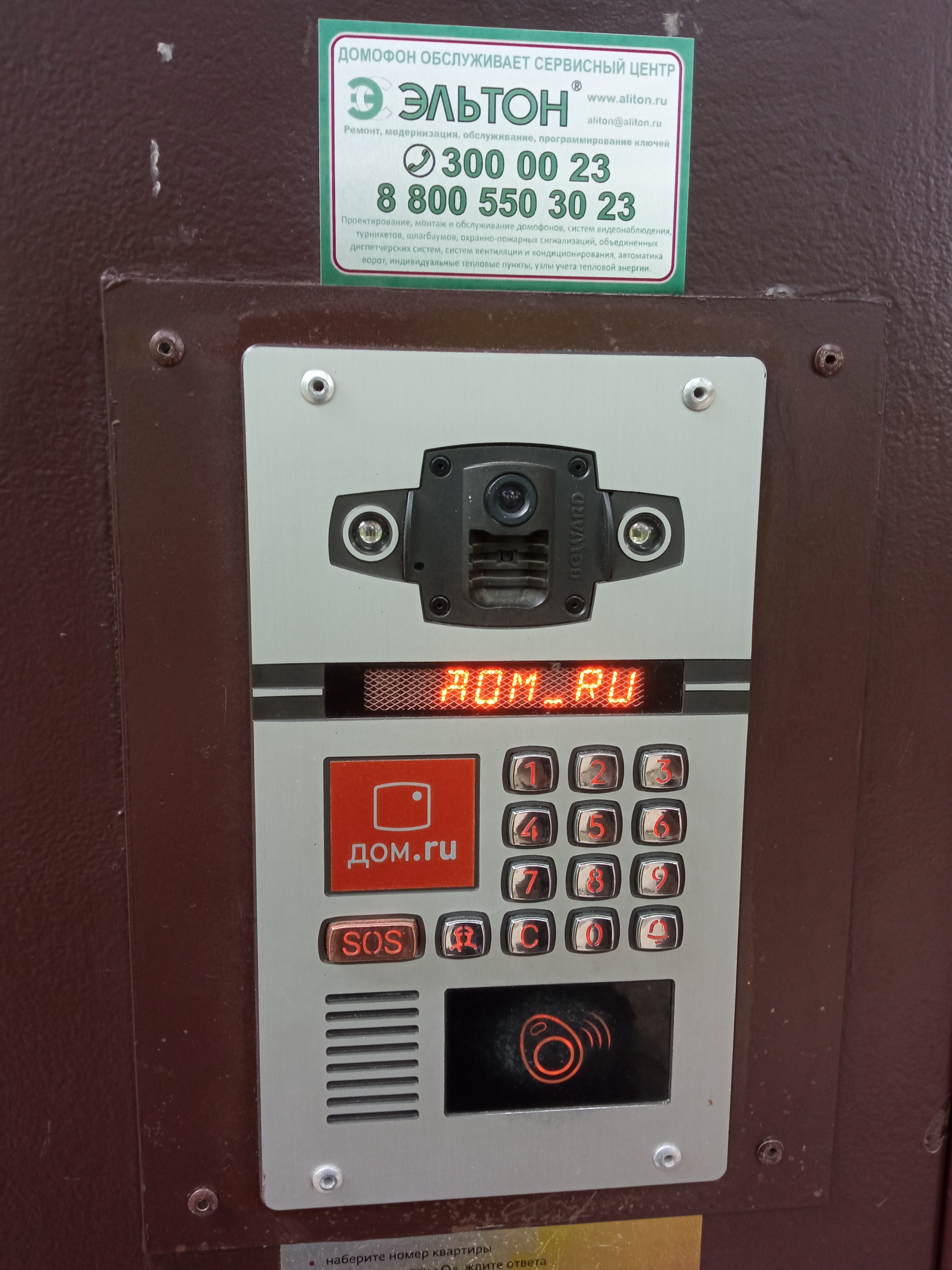
Outdoor phone plate with camera at video door phone

A door phone or door bell phone is a set of electrical and electronic elements used to handle communication between a resident in a house, apartment or villa and a guest outside. The device can also lock or unlock the door it has been configured to work with. Door phones have been used across a variety of commercial and residential buildings. For example, offices and apartment blocks both make frequent use of door phones. They are so widely used that, nowadays, they form part of the standard electrical installation of most buildings.

The simplest version is an intercom that establishes a communication between an entryway at street level and a resident inside the house. A loudspeaker installed at the street level entrance allows a building resident to speak to their visitor. In buildings where there are more than one door phone plate located outside of a building's entrance, each door phone has a certain number of buttons depending on the number of units in each building.

== Operation ==
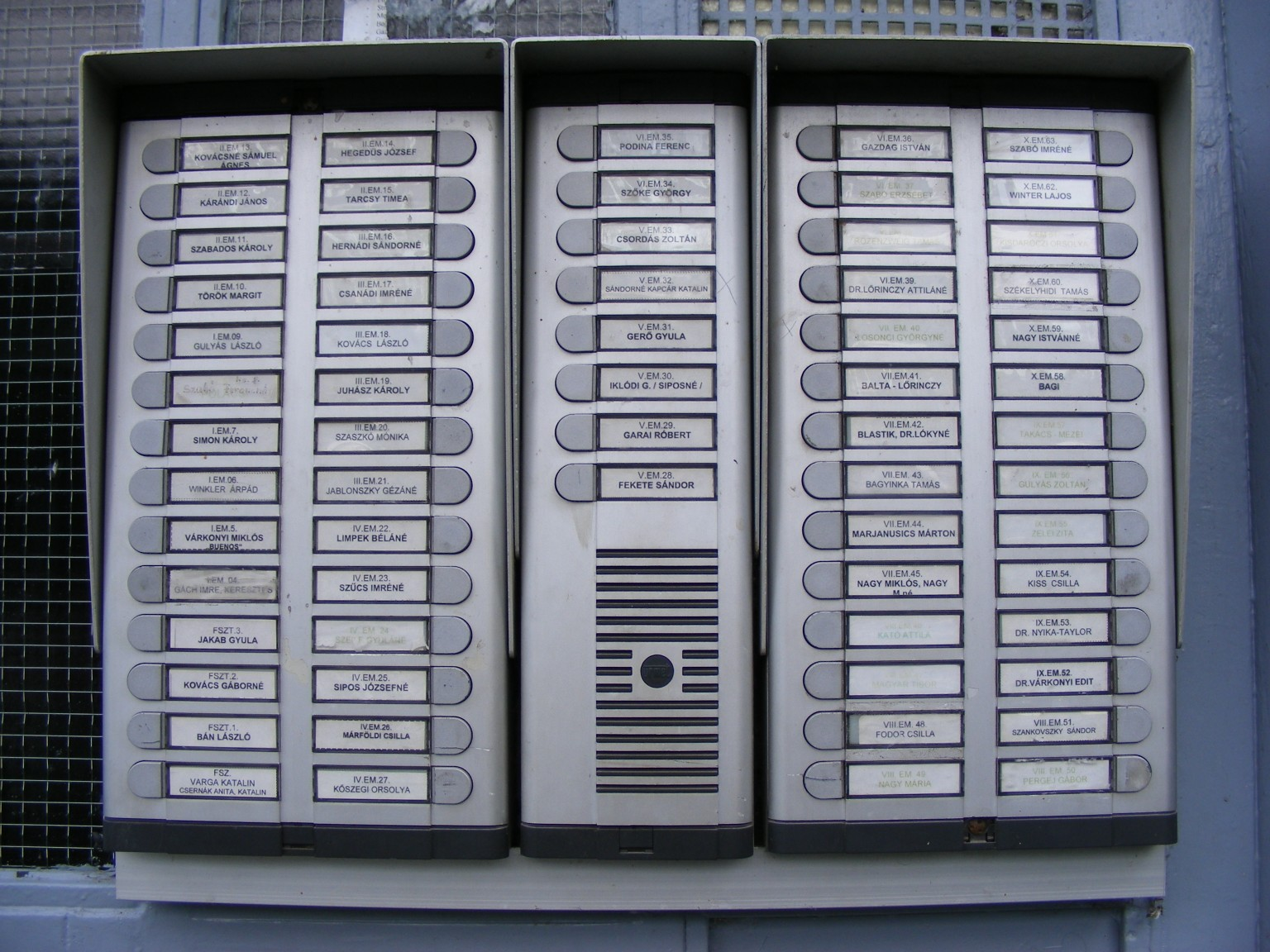
Modern outdoor phone plate with a push buttons matrix

A door phone in its most basic version is a two-way intercom allowing communication from the street to the inside of a building. More complex door phones are connected to electric strikes, and can unlock and open the door to allow access to the interior of the building.

The part of the door phone on the exterior of a building is known as the door phone plate. It is located at the outside of the entrance of each building. Door phone plates consist of a matrix of buttons. each of them drive a buzzer located in a unit inside each apartment building. Each apartment building contains a button that can activate the electric strike.

There are several installation systems, the most traditional being a system known as 4 + 1, named for the types of wiring that it requires. A 4 + 1 system requires four wires that handle power, communication, and the door system, and another wire for communication between an in-unit apartment resident and the person using the door phone.

== Video door phones ==
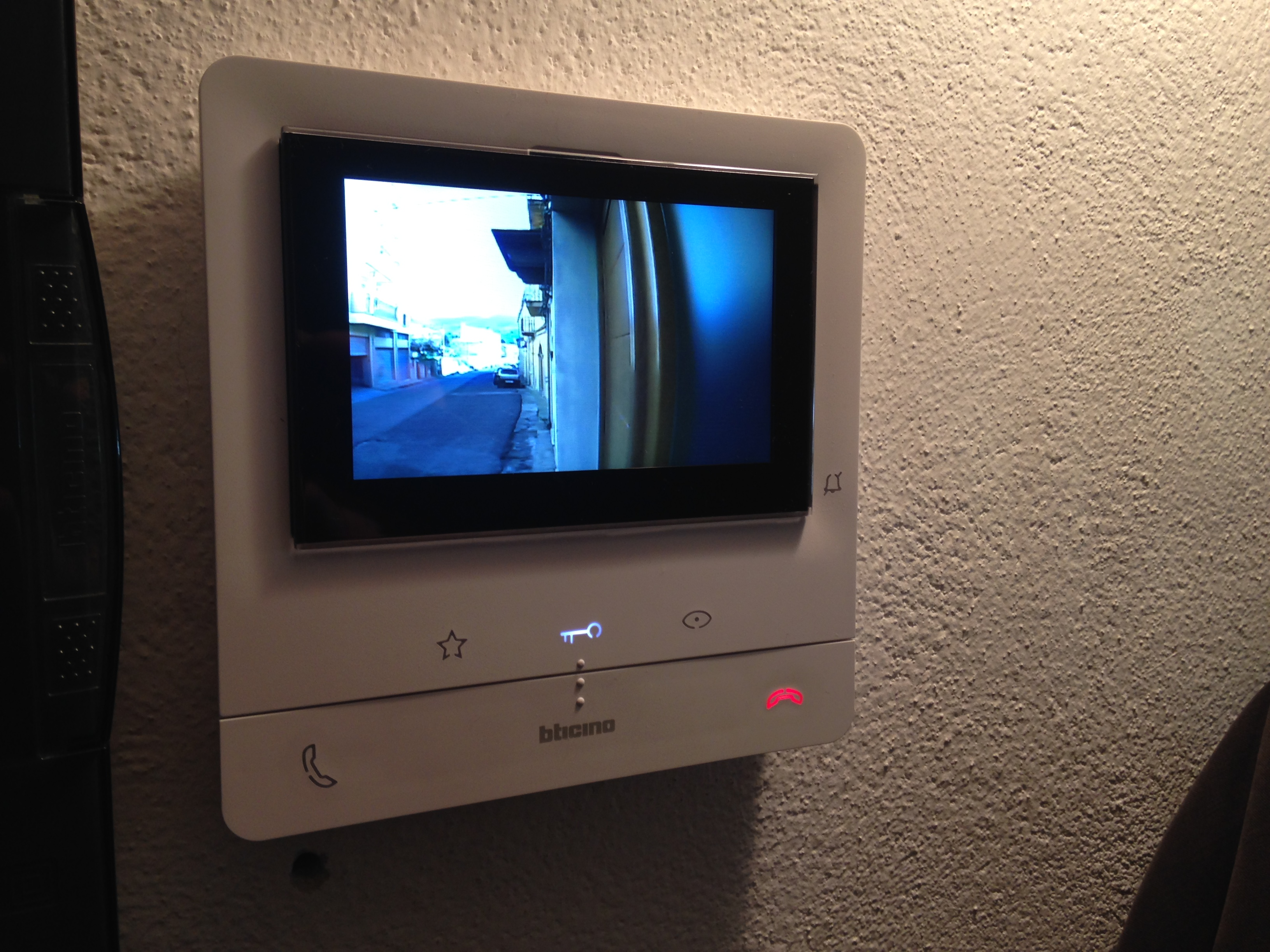
A video intercom showing a view of the door outside

Video door phones have a video installation in addition to the audio. In these cases, the intercom plate has the same structure as the previous version but features a video monitor connected to a surveillance camera that allows inspecting the person who pressed the button and part of the surrounding area.

== Access control systems ==
Some manufacturers have also adopted the possibility of opening the door via a keyboard. By introducing a numerical secret code the electric strike is operated. Although there is also the possibility of being used as an access control with either a magnetic card or a smart card.

== Wiring topology ==
Among other classifications there is one with three different types of door phones that differ mainly in the number of wires required in their installation, having some parallelism between different manufacturers, that use different communication protocols but a similar wiring topology:

- Conventional: This system is characterized by the use of four wires plus of wires for each home. That is, (4 + "n") wires, where "n" indicates the number of homes. This system is best suited for medium-sized buildings.
- Simplified: This system is characterized by using a wire pair, plus the number of homes in threads. That is, (1 + "n") wires, where "n" indicates the number of homes. It is best suited for medium-sized buildings with two or three entrance gates.
- Digital: This system more suitable for use in large buildings or complex installations, as it ensures maximum capacity and ease of installation. It is characterized for using only two wires for all facilities.

== See also ==
- Courtesy telephone
- Intercom
- Speaking tube
- Video door-phone
