= Intercom =

Voice communications system for use within a local area

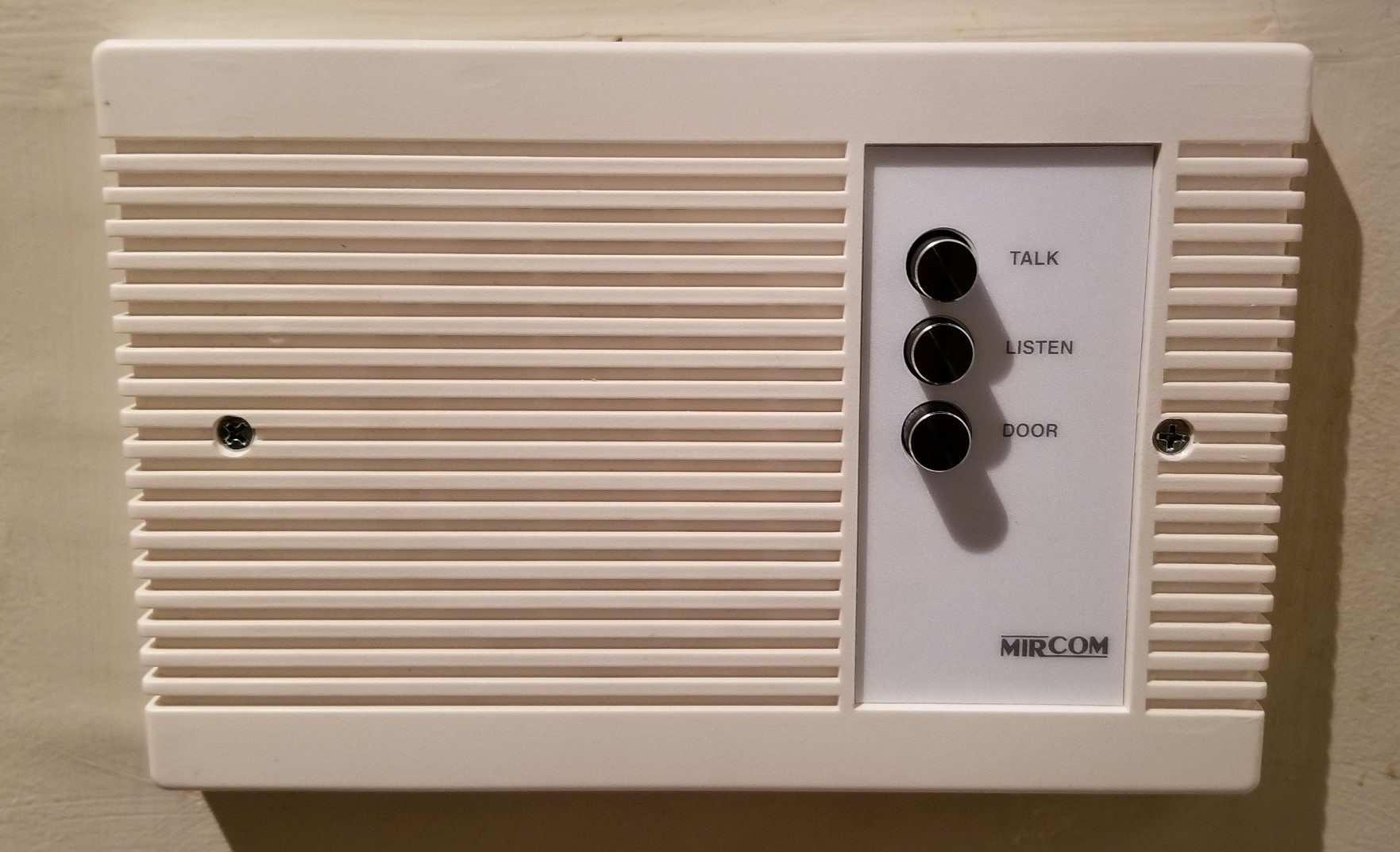
1980s MirTone intercom system

An intercom, also called an intercommunication device, intercommunicator, or interphone, is a stand-alone voice communications system for use within a building, small collection of buildings or portably within a small coverage area, which functions independently of the public telephone network. Intercoms are generally mounted permanently in buildings and vehicles, but can also be detachable and portable. Intercoms can incorporate connections to public address loudspeaker systems, walkie-talkies, telephones, and other intercom systems. Some intercom systems incorporate control of devices such as signal lights and door latches.

Intercoms are used on a wide variety of properties, from houses that only require one connection between a resident and the property's entrance to multi-unit apartments that require intercom hardware to be installed in every individual apartment. Some are equipped with video and its wiring (electrical installation) can be connected to the outside with a few pairs (4-6 pairs) while controlling an electric strike. The latest generations are even compatible with computers and some models include TCP/IP compatibility.

== Permanent systems ==
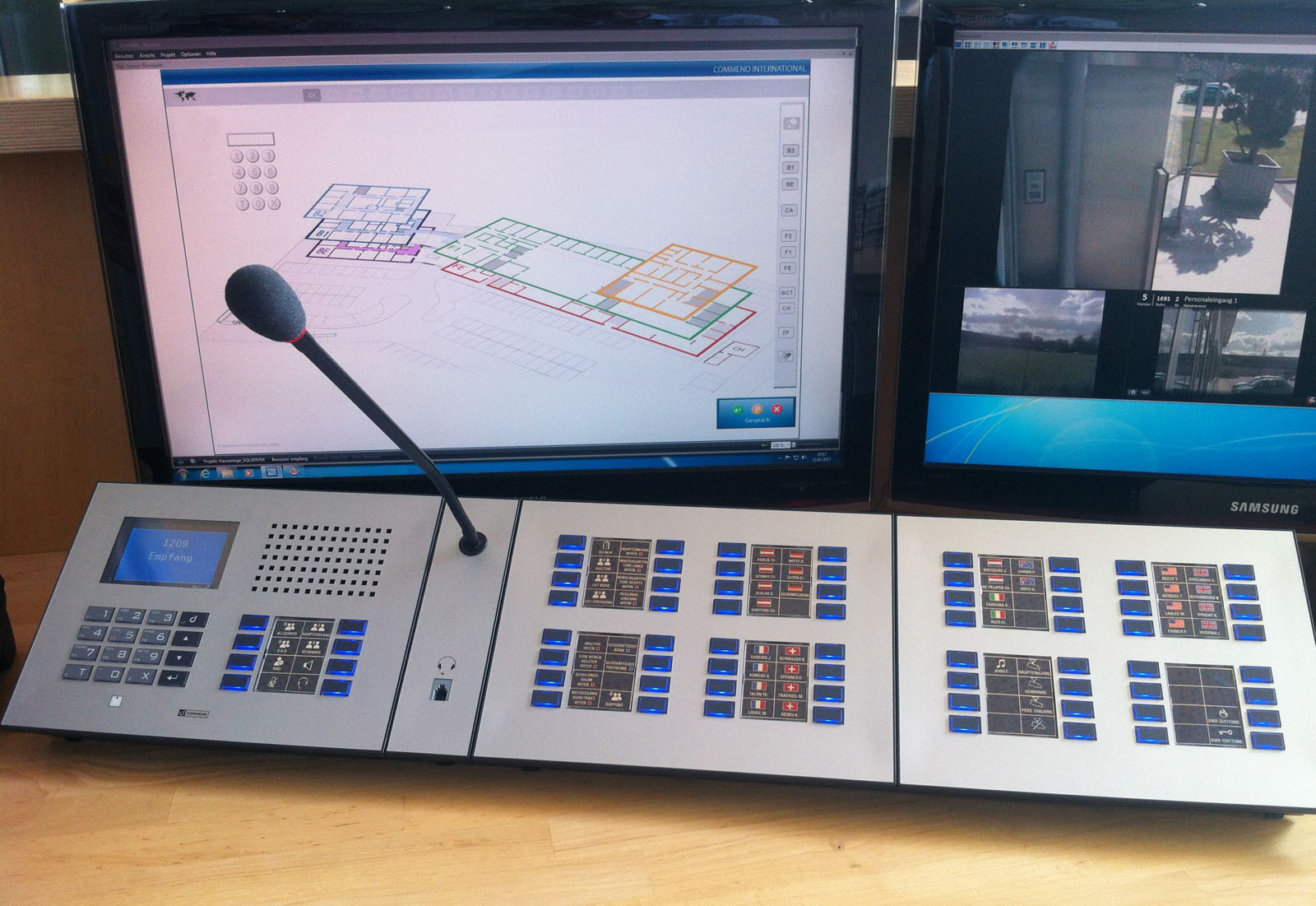
An intercom control desk

Traditional intercoms and public address systems are composed entirely of analogue electronics components but many new features and interfacing options can be accomplished with new intercom systems based on digital connections. Video signals can be carried as well as voice. Digital intercom stations can be connected using Cat 5 cable and can even use existing computer networks as a means of interfacing distant parties. Intercom cameras can be used in modern offices and hotels.

Many schools and office buildings now use audio/video systems to identify visitors trying to gain access to a locked building and can be interfaced with the building's access control system.

Besides fixed locations, intercom systems are used on many types of vehicles, including trains, watercraft, aircraft and armoured fighting vehicles.

== Portable systems ==
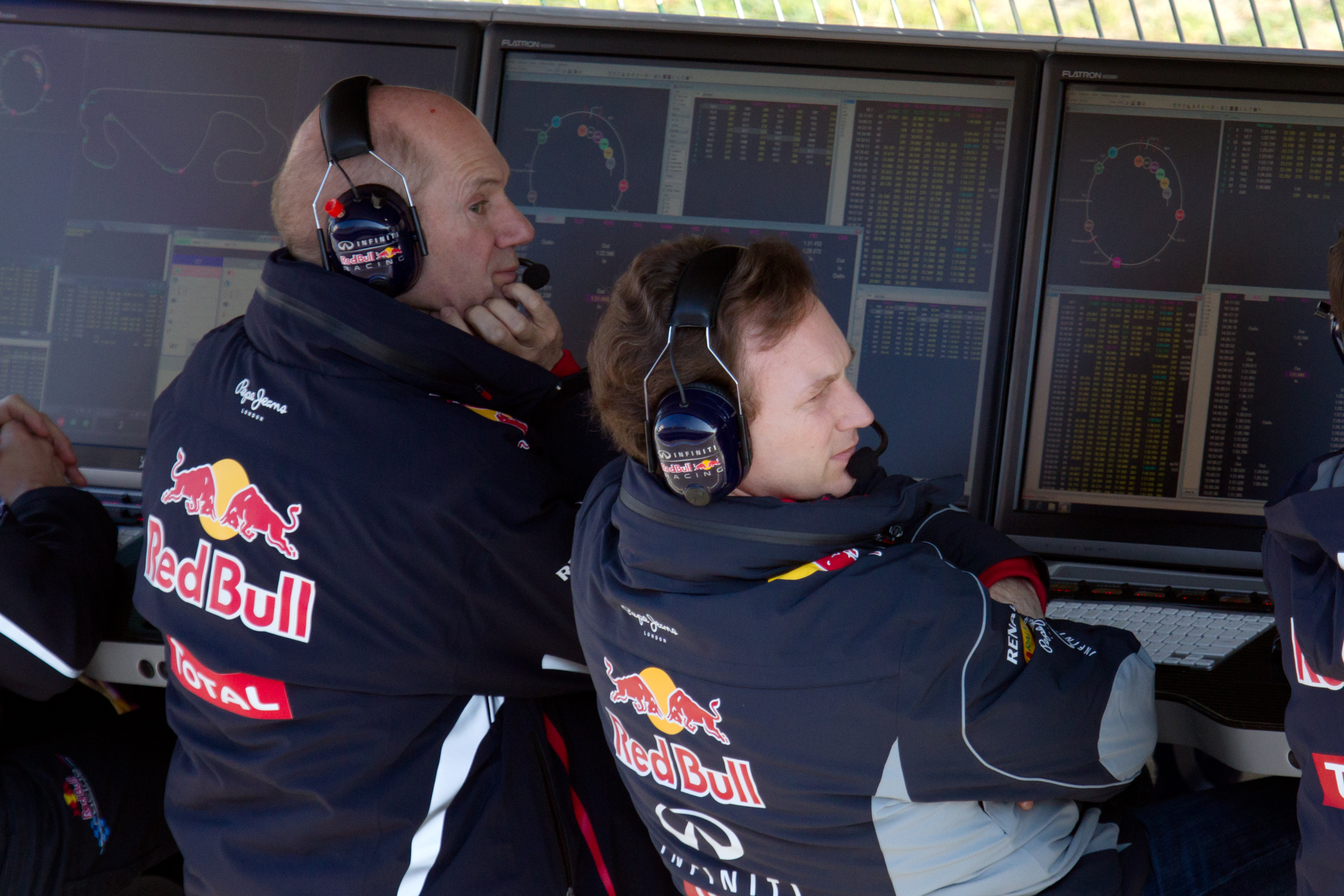
Intercom used for team and driver communication in Formula One

Portable intercoms are commonly used by special event production crews and professional sports teams. Performing arts venues such as theaters and concert halls often have a combination of permanently mounted and portable intercom elements. Motorsports race tracks often have both portable and permanent intercom stations mounted at critical points around the racecourse for use by race officials and emergency medical technicians.

Portable intercoms are also used for motorcycle communication, for example, between motorcyclist and passenger, bike-to-bike communication or communication within a pack of riders. Intercom mounting systems can be attached to most motorcycle helmets. Several different types of technologies can be used, including various types of citizens band radio like for example PMR446, Bluetooth, or dynamic mesh communication (DMC) which is a mesh based intercom system developed for motorcycle communication.

== Basic intercom system terms ==
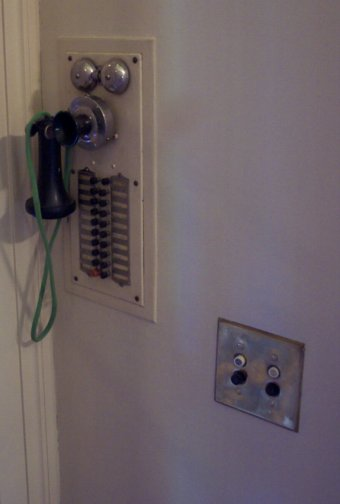
Intercom system in the Pittock Mansion

Intercom installers, suppliers, and manufacturers often use the following terms to refer to intercom components.

- Master station or base station: These units control the whole system. Master stations initiate calls to substations and can be configured to make announcements that are transmitted over the entire intercom system.
- Substation: Units that initiate calls with a master station, but are not capable of initiating calls with any other stations. Substations are also known as slave units.
- Door station: Like substations, door stations are only capable of initiating a call to a master station. They are typically weather-proof.
- Intercom station: A full-featured remote unit that is capable of initiating and receiving party-line conversation, individual conversations, and signalling. May be rack-mounted, wall-mounted or portable.
- Wall mount station: Fixed-position intercom station with built-in loudspeaker. May have flush-mounted microphone, hand-held push-to-talk microphone or telephone-style handset.
- Belt pack: Portable intercom station worn on the belt such as an interruptible feedback (IFB) with an earpiece worn by talent.
- Handset: Permanent or portable telephone-style connection to an intercom station. Holds both an earpiece and a push to talk microphone.
- Headset: Portable intercom connection from a belt pack to one or both ears via headphones with integrated microphone on a boom arm. Connects to a belt pack.
- Paging signal: An audible and/or visual alert at an intercom station, indicating that someone at another station wants to initiate a conversation.
- Power supply: Used to feed power to all units. Often incorporated into the design of the base station.
- Telephonic: Intercom systems that utilize a transmitter (talk) and receiver (listen) to communicate, similar to standard telephone systems.
- Amplified: Intercom systems that utilize a single speaker to transmit and receive communications.
- Amplifier: An intercom system's main or central component, responsible for switching or connecting communication paths between master and substations. In addition, amplifiers distribute or switch power to auxiliary connected devices, such as door strikes, to allow entry.

== Wired ==
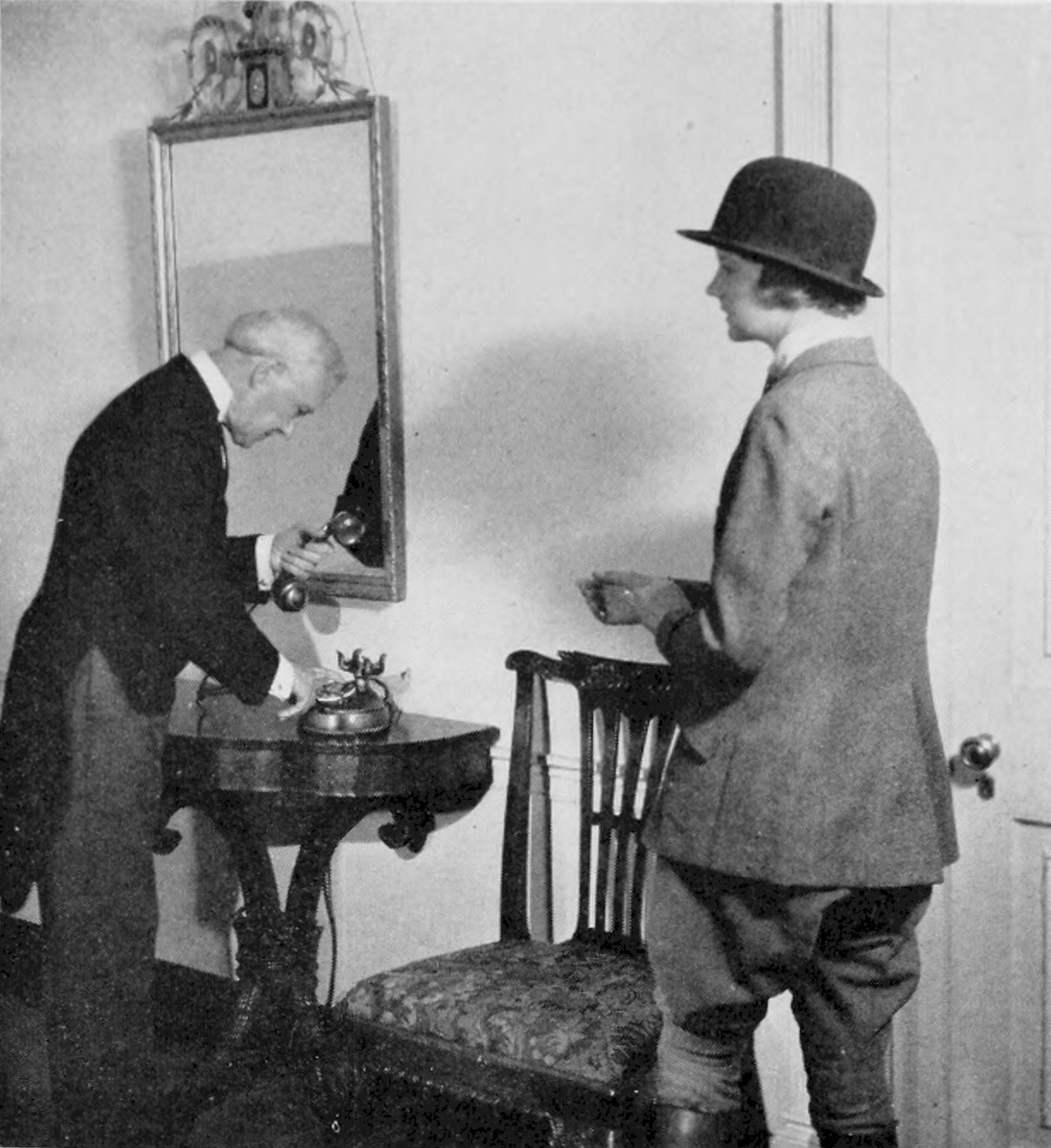
A butler uses an intercom on behalf of a lady

While every intercom product line is different, most analogue intercom systems have much in common. Voice signals of about a volt or two are carried atop a direct current power rail of 12, 30 or 48 volts which uses a pair of conductors. Signal light indications between stations can be accomplished through the use of additional conductors or can be carried on the main voice pair via tone frequencies sent above or below the speech frequency range. Multiple channels of simultaneous conversations can be carried over additional conductors within a cable or by frequency- or time-division multiplexing in the analogue domain. Multiple channels can easily be carried by packet-switched digital intercom signals.

Portable intercoms are connected primarily using common shielded, twisted pair microphone cabling terminated with 3-pin XLR connectors. Building and vehicle intercoms are connected in a similar manner with shielded cabling often containing more than one twisted pair.

Digital intercoms use Category 5 cable and relay information back and forth in data packets using the Internet protocol suite.

=== Two-wire broadcast intercoms ===
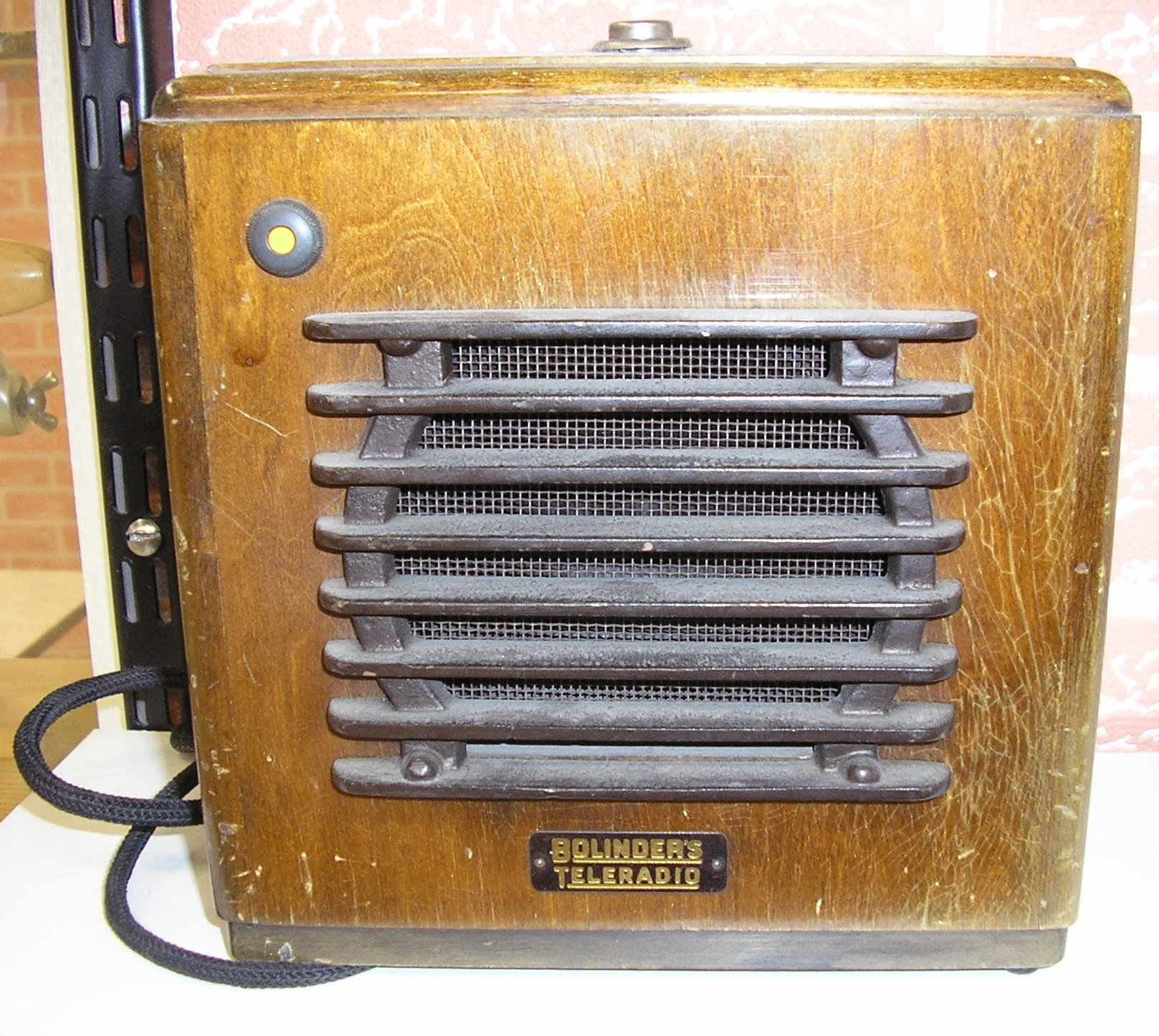
Sub-station by Bolinder's Teleradio (1950s)

Intercom systems are widely used in TV stations and outside broadcast vehicles such as those seen at sporting events or entertainment venues. There are essentially two different types of intercoms used in the television world: two-wire party line or four-wire matrix systems. In the beginning, TV stations would simply build their own communication systems using old phone equipment. However, today there are several manufacturers offering off-the-shelf systems. From the late 1970s until the mid-90s, the two-wire party line-type systems were the most popular, primarily due to the technology that was available at the time. The two-channel variety used a 32-volt impedance-generating central power supply to drive external stations or belt packs. This type of format allowed the two channels to operate in standard microphone cable, a feature highly desired by the broadcasters. These systems were very robust and simple to design, maintain and operate but had limited capacity and flexibility as they were usually hardwired. A typical user on the system could not choose whom to talk to. He would communicate with the same person or group of people until the system was manually reconfigured to allow communication with a different group of people. Two-wire routers or source assignment panels were then implemented to allow quick re-routing. This reconfiguration was usually handled at a central location, but because voltage is used on the circuit to power the external user stations as well as communicate, there would usually be a pop when the channels were switched. So while one could change the system on the fly, it was usually not desirable to do so in the middle of a production, as the popping noise would distract the rest of the television crew.

=== Four-wire broadcast intercoms ===
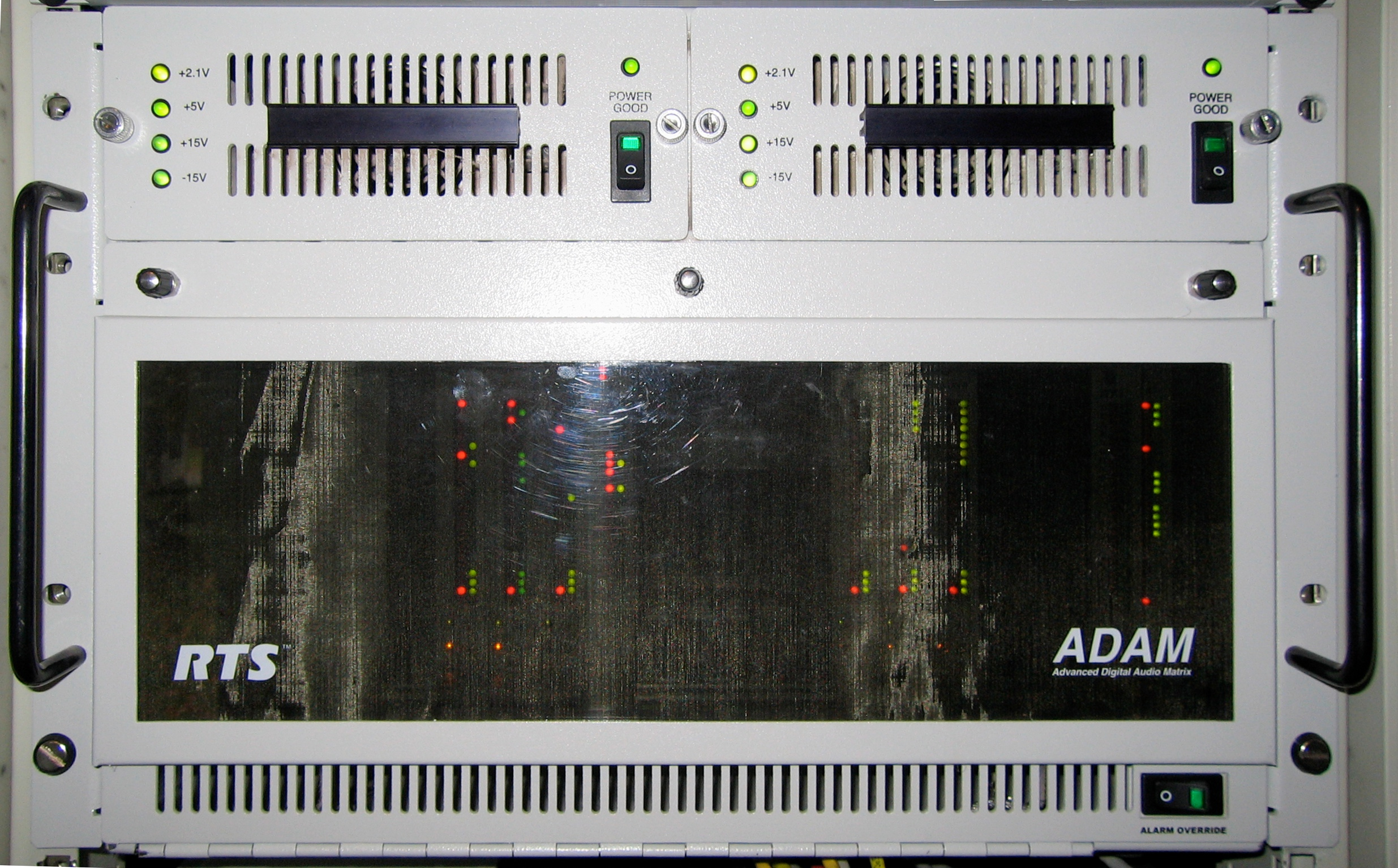
A modern four-wire intercom system capable of 272 sources and destinations manufactured by Telex Communications Inc.

In the mid-90s four-wire technology started gaining more prominence due to the technology getting cheaper and smaller. Four-wire circuit technology had been around for quite some time but was very expensive to implement. It usually required a large footprint in the physical television studio, thus was only used at very large television stations or television networks.

== Wireless ==
For installations where it is not desirable or possible to run wires to support an intercom system, wireless intercom systems are available. There are two major benefits of a wireless intercom system over a traditional wired intercom. The first is that installation is much easier since no wires have to be run between intercom units. The second is that you can easily move the units at any time. With that convenience and ease of installation comes a risk of interference from other wireless and electrical devices. Nearby wireless devices such as cordless telephones, wireless data networks, and remote audio speakers, as well as structural features in your building, can all interfere. Electrical devices such as motors, lighting fixtures and transformers can cause noise. There may be concerns about privacy since conversations may be picked up on a scanner, baby monitor, cordless phone, or a similar device on the same frequency. Encrypted wireless intercoms can reduce or eliminate privacy risks, while placement, installation, construction, grounding and shielding methods can reduce or eliminate the detrimental effects of external interference. The United States and Canada have several frequency ranges for wireless intercom systems and other wireless products. They are 49 MHz, FM band (200–270 kHz), 494–608 MHz, 900 MHz, 2.4 GHz, 5.8 GHz, and MURS (150 MHz). IP Intercoms are now appearing that connect a Master to an IP Substation elsewhere on the Internet, via an Ethernet port. Wireless intercoms can also run over a mesh network that allows near-instant communication throughout a house.

Power line communication units that send signal over house wiring have been referred to as "wireless" intercoms. Though they are technically wired intercoms, they are based on existing wiring and thus require no additional wires.

== Telephone intercoms ==
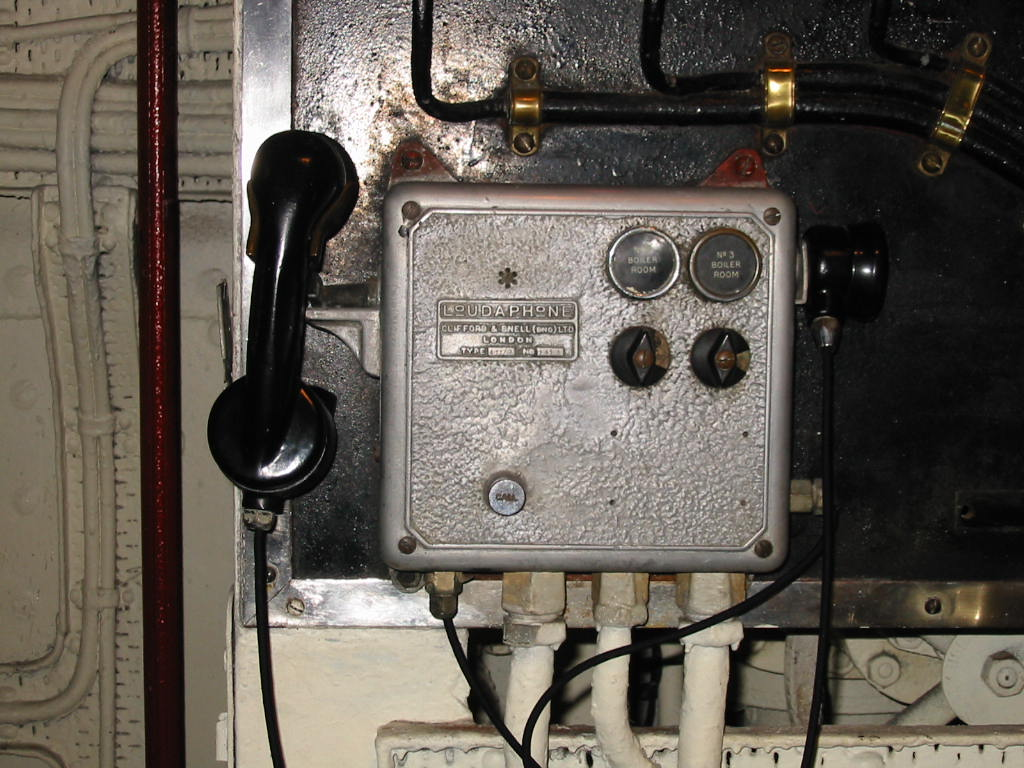
Loudaphone brand intercom station aboard RMS Queen Mary. The Loudaphone was specified for noisy environments such as aboard trains and trams and within a ship's engine room.

Some telephones include intercom functions that enable paging and conversation between instruments of similar make and model. Examples include Panasonic model KX-TS3282W(/B), AT&T models 945 and 974, and TMC model ET4300.

A single device can add intercom functionality to multiple standard telephones on a common phone line, even of different makes and models. Installation effort is minimal, and is not vulnerable to the radio interference and security issues of wireless systems. The Add-A-Com Whole House Intercom for Standard Telephone Systems is such a device. Intercom paging is accomplished by sounding a distinctive ring from all telephones after any phone is taken briefly off hook. After paging, any number of phones may converse. The device temporarily disconnects the external phone line during intercom use, and reconnects when all phones are again on hook. During intercom use, an external call’s ringing signal can be heard in the earpiece.

Many key telephone systems for office use provide access to multiple outside lines plus an intercom, where the latter appeared as if it were one of the individually selectable lines. The Western Electric Model 207 and Model 6A intercoms were designed for integration into such key system multiline installations, providing one or two simultaneous intercom calls, respectively.

== Cell phone intercoms ==
A cell phone network intercom is an outdoor device that communicates wirelessly over the cell phone network with any landline or mobile phone worldwide. Often called GSM intercoms, they initially used the Global System for Mobile Communications standard, and the intercoms were first released in European countries. This standard is now used globally, though in the United States, primarily AT&T, T-Mobile, and a few other providers use GSM, while Sprint and Verizon use CDMA (Code Division Multiple Access) technology. Modern cell phone intercoms support all carriers and the latest technologies. Commonly installed at gates or doors, they are popular because they eliminate the need for wiring, except for power.

== IP and SIP-based intercoms ==
Modern intercoms increasingly use Internet Protocol networks rather than analog wiring, often built on the Session Initiation Protocol (SIP) signaling standard developed for voice over IP (VoIP) telephony. SIP-based intercoms establish, maintain, and terminate calls over a local area network or the public internet, and can be addressed in the same way as a VoIP phone extension.

Because SIP intercoms run over existing network infrastructure, installation typically requires only Power over Ethernet cabling rather than dedicated audio wiring. The protocol also enables integration with adjacent building systems such as closed-circuit television, access control platforms, and alarm systems, and supports remote answer on smartphones through a softphone or mobile application. Industry adoption accelerated in the 2010s and 2020s, particularly in multi-tenant residential buildings and commercial facilities.

== See also ==
- Courtesy telephone, a telephone for relaying messages to a specific person after being notified via a public address system, or for customers to seek information
- Door phone, electronic device for communication with someone outside a building
  - Video door-phone, audiovisual communication device enabling visual identification of a visitor
- Public address system, a system for distributing the voice of an announcer over a large area
- Speaking tube, an air pipe through which speech can be transmitted over an extended distance
- Tank phone, similar device used in Tanks and Armoured vehicles
- Voice chat in online gaming
