= Videophone (disambiguation) =

A videophone is an audiovisual telecommunication device.

Videophone, video phone, or Video Phone may also refer to:

- Video door-phone, a stand-alone intercom system used for calls made at the entrance to a building with access controlled by audiovisual communication between the inside and outside
- "Video Phone" (song), a 2009 song by Beyoncé that was later remixed into a version featuring Lady Gaga
- Videophone, a 2012 British short film starring Bob Cryer
