= Video door-phone =

Stand-alone intercom system

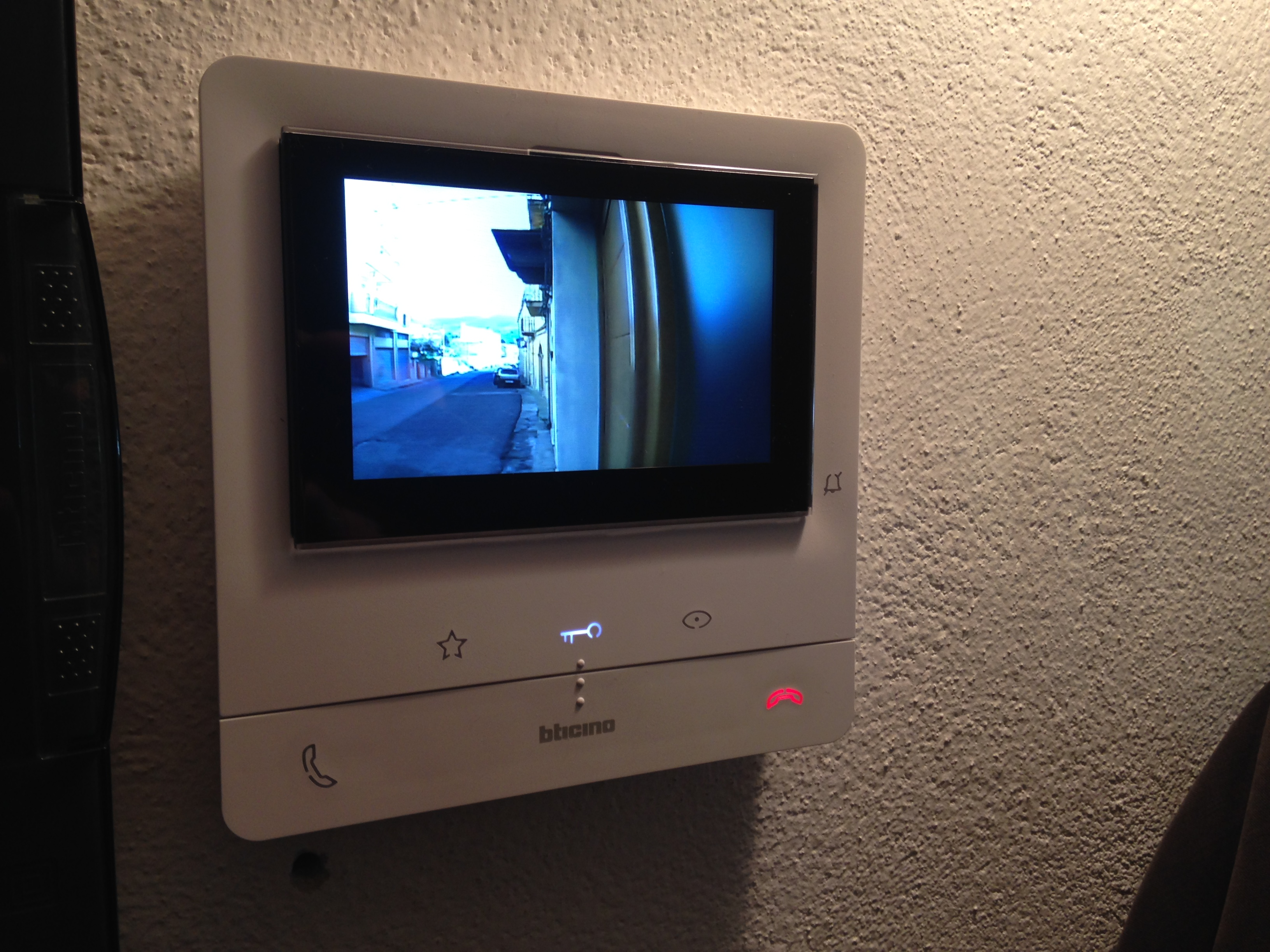
A video intercom showing a view of the door outside

A video door-phone, also known as a video door entry or video intercom, is a phone with a monitor displaying visitors at the entrance to a building. It is typically a stand-alone intercom system used for calls made at the entrance to a residential complex, detached family home, or workplace, with access controlled by audiovisual communication between the inside and outside. Video door entry enables the person indoors to view and talk with the visitor, and open the door remotely.

== Equipment ==
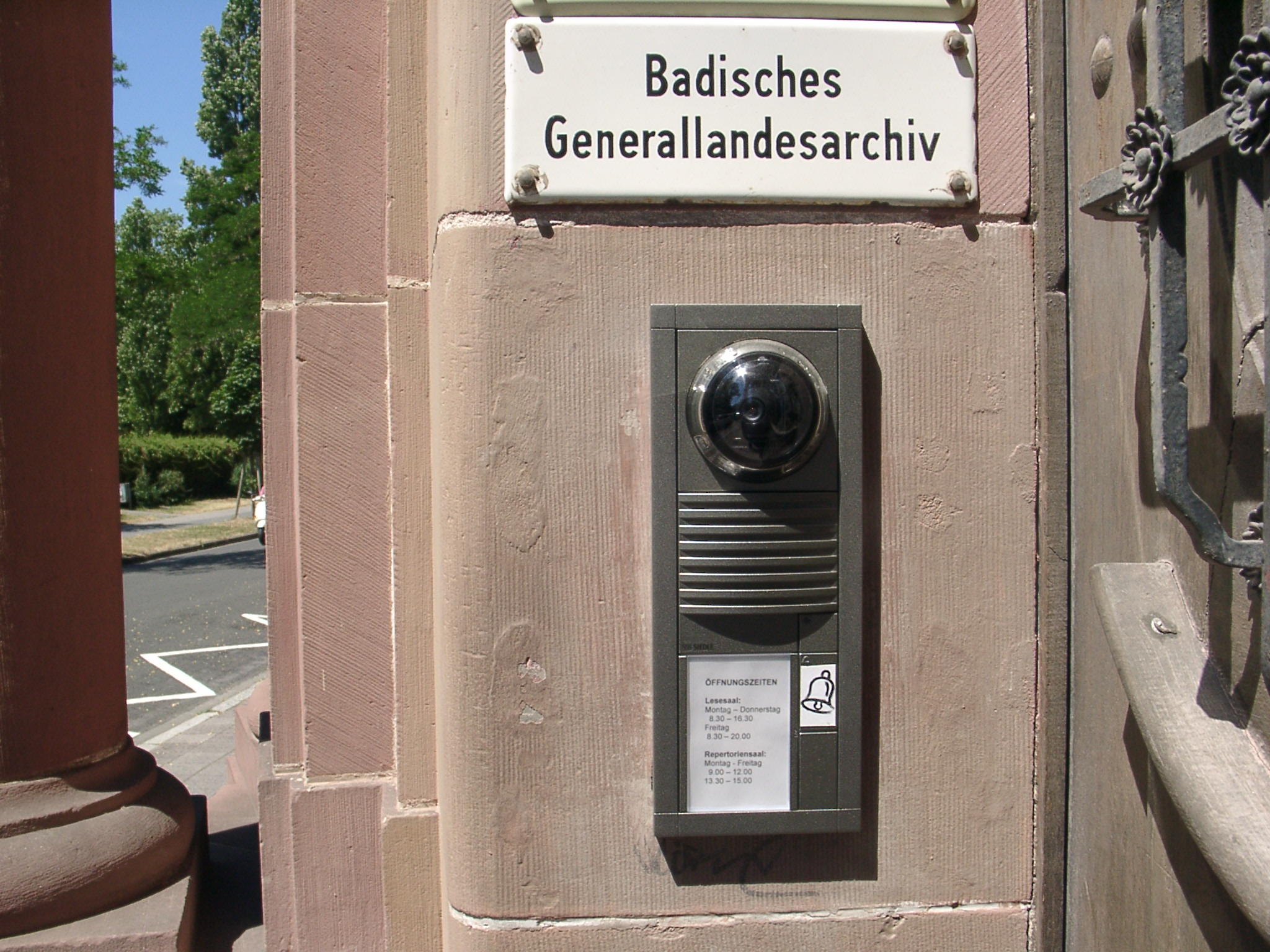
A doorbell with a camera

Video door entry has both outside and indoor elements: an outdoor panel on the outside with a camera, audio intercom, and electronic lock release, and an indoor monitor. The outdoor panel or street panel is installed beside the entrance door or gateway and incorporates several weather-proof elements: one or several pushbuttons to make the call (usually one per home or apartment), a micro camera supporting night vision to view the caller, a microphone and loudspeaker for conversation, and an electronic latch to open the door remotely. A monitor indoors has a screen showing the caller's image, a microphone and earpiece for conversation, and a pushbutton to trigger the door lock release.

== Common equipment types ==
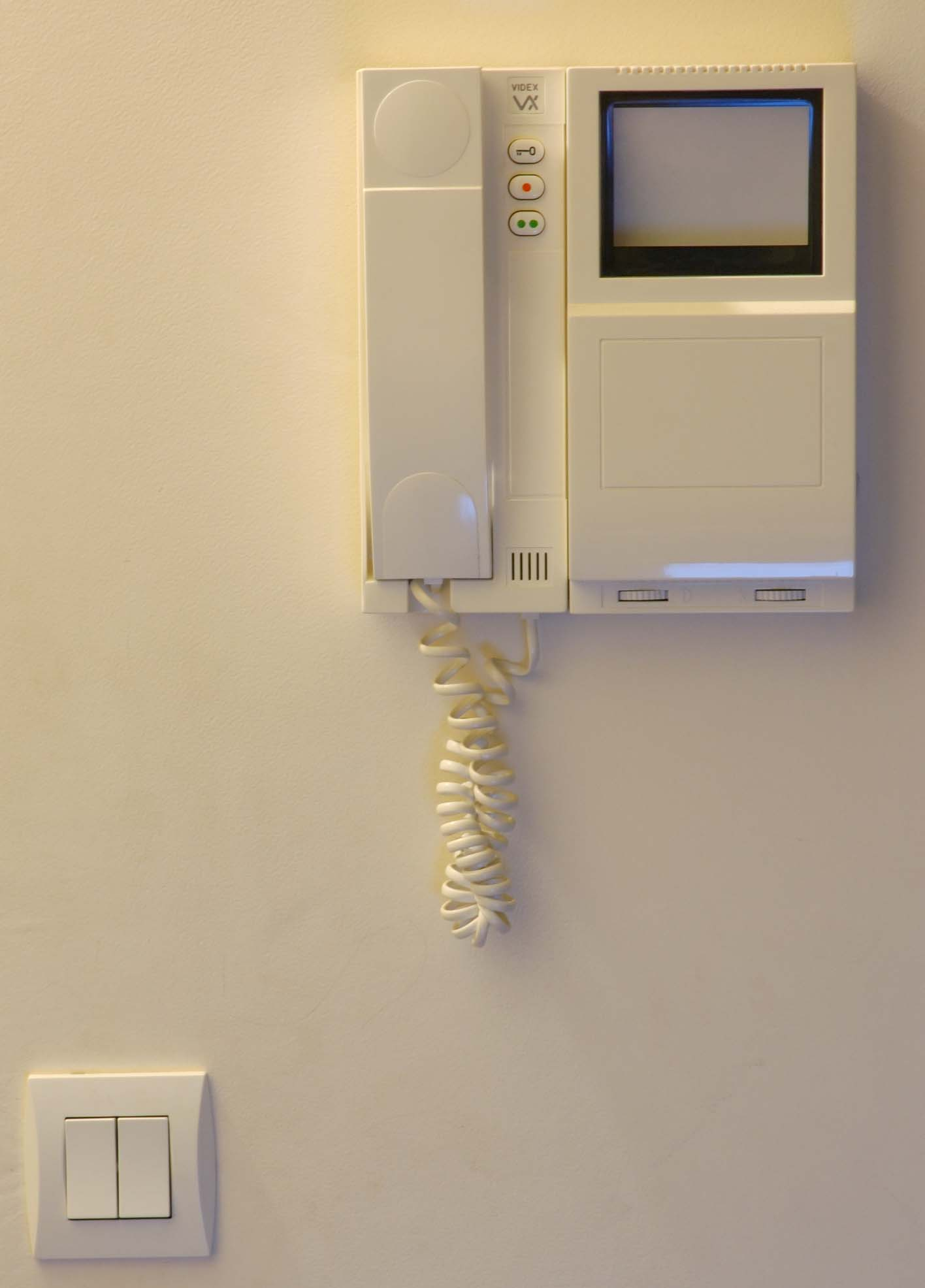
A video door phone monitor with a handset

There are several variations on this basic format. The outdoor panel for a building with multiple occupants may have one pushbutton per apartment, or a numeric keypad to key in the occupant's number. Others have built-in cardholder panels or small screens. Some video entry monitors have an earpiece similar to a telephone handset, while others use a speaker. Monitors may have memories that store images.

== Adaptive equipment ==
Different equipment sets are currently found on the market which make use more accessible for people with different disabilities. So, thinking of the visually impaired, the outdoor panel may include information in Braille alongside the pushbuttons, or a voice synthesiser can also be added which indicates when the door is opened. For people with hearing impairment, the outdoor panel may include a screen with icons signalling the communication status: if the user is calling, if someone is speaking from indoors or opening the door. Also with this type of user in mind, the monitor may be fitted with an inductive loop, an element that interacts with conventional hearing aids to facilitate the conversation with the outside without their presence being noticed by other users. The kit also includes visual or audio call alerts.

== See also ==
- Courtesy telephone
- Door phone
- Intercom
- Speaking tube
