= Electronic lock =

Locking device which operates by means of electric current

A quick demonstration of an electronic door lock

An electronic lock (or electric lock) is a locking device which operates by means of electric current. Electric locks are sometimes stand-alone with an electronic control assembly mounted directly to the lock. Electric locks may be connected to an access control system, the advantages of which include: key control, where keys can be added and removed without re-keying the lock cylinder; fine access control, where time and place are factors; and transaction logging, where activity is recorded. Electronic locks can also be remotely monitored and controlled, both to lock and to unlock.

== Operation ==
Electric locks use magnets, solenoids, or motors to actuate the lock by either supplying or removing power. Operating the lock can be as simple as using a switch, for example an apartment intercom door release, or as complex as a biometric based access control system.

There are two basic types of locks: "preventing mechanism" or operation mechanism.

== Types ==
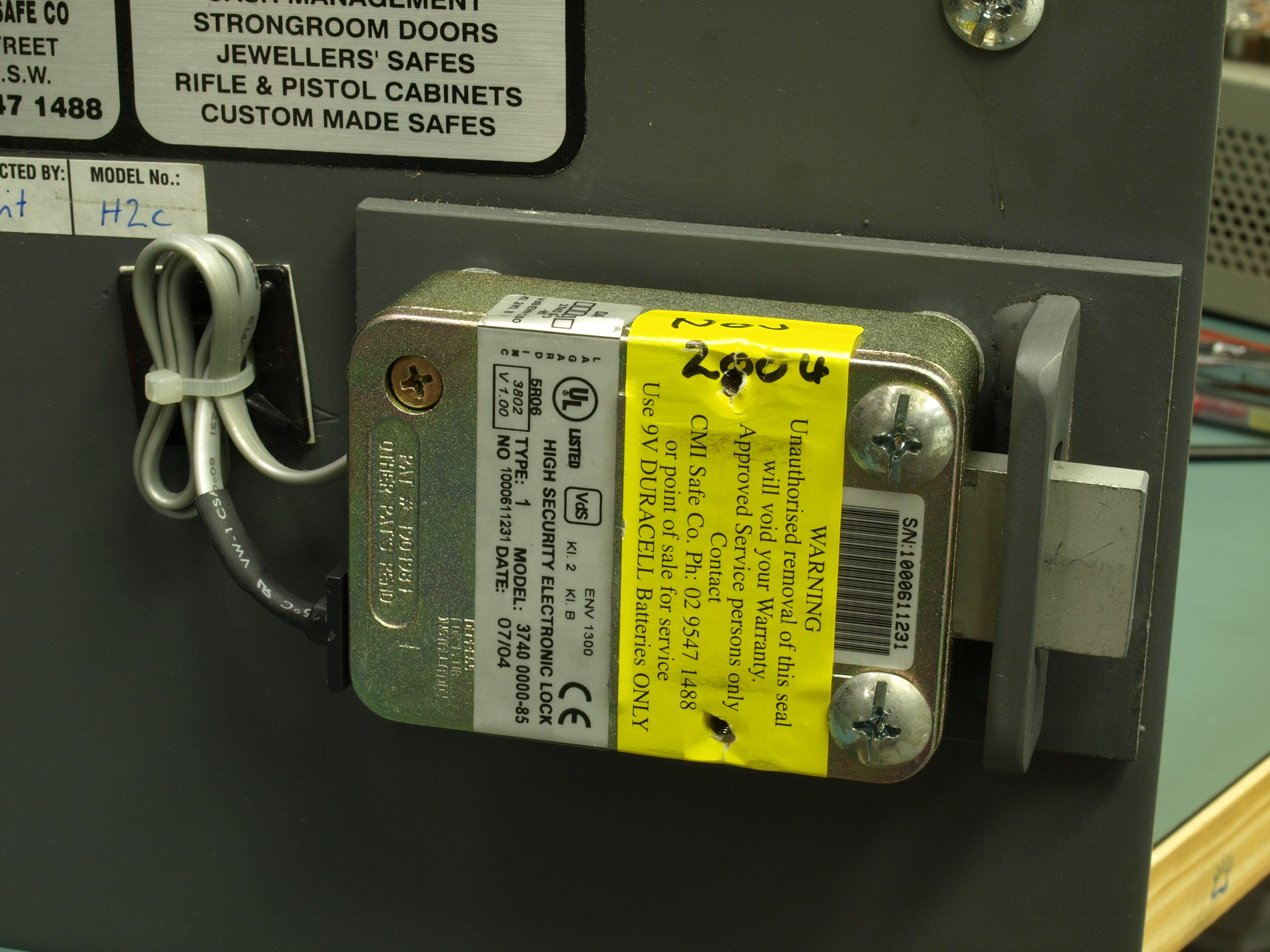
A deadbolt electronic lock mounted in a home safe

=== Electromagnetic lock ===
The most basic type of electronic lock is a magnetic lock (informally called a "mag lock"). A large electro-magnet is mounted on the door frame and a corresponding armature is mounted on the door. When the magnet is powered and the door is closed, the armature is held fast to the magnet. Mag locks are simple to install and are very attack-resistant. One drawback is that improperly installed or maintained mag locks can fall on people, and also that one must unlock the mag lock to both enter and to leave. This has caused fire marshals to impose strict rules on the use of mag locks and access control practice in general. Additionally, NFPA 101 (Standard for Life Safety and Security), as well as the ADA (Americans with Disability Act) require "no prior knowledge" and "one simple movement" to allow "free egress". This means that in an emergency, a person must be able to move to a door and immediately exit with one motion (requiring no push buttons, having another person unlock the door, reading a sign, or "special knowledge").

Other problems include a lag time (delay), because the collapsing magnetic field holding the door shut does not release instantaneously. This lag time can cause a user to collide with the still-locked door. Finally, mag locks fail unlocked, in other words, if electrical power is removed they unlock. This could be a problem where security is a primary concern. Additionally, power outages could affect mag locks installed on fire listed doors, which are required to remain latched at all times except when personnel are passing through. Most mag lock designs would not meet current fire codes as the primary means of securing a fire listed door to a frame. Because of this, many commercial doors (this typically does not apply to private residences) are moving over to stand-alone locks, or electric locks installed under a Certified Personnel Program.

The first mechanical recodable card lock was invented in 1976 by Tor Sørnes, who had worked for VingCard since the 1950s. The first card lock order was shipped in 1979 to Westin Peachtree Plaza Hotel, Atlanta, US. This product triggered the evolution of electronic locks for the hospitality industry.

=== Electronic strikes ===
Electric strikes (also called electric latch release) replace a standard strike mounted on the door frame and receive the latch and latch bolt. Electric strikes can be simplest to install when they are designed for one-for-one drop-in replacement of a standard strike, but some electric strike designs require that the door frame be heavily modified. Installation of a strike into a fire listed door (for open backed strikes on pairs of doors) or the frame must be done under listing agency authority, if any modifications to the frame are required (mostly for commercial doors and frames). In the US, since there is no current Certified Personnel Program to allow field installation of electric strikes into fire listed door openings, listing agency field evaluations would most likely require the door and frame to be de-listed and replaced.

Electric strikes can allow mechanical free egress: a departing person operates the lockset in the door, not the electric strike in the door frame. Electric strikes can also be either "fail unlocked" (except in Fire Listed Doors, as they must remain latched when power is not present), or the more-secure "fail locked" design. Electric strikes are easier to attack than a mag lock. It is simple to lever the door open at the strike, as often there is an increased gap between the strike and the door latch. Latch guard plates are often used to cover this gap.

=== Electronic deadbolts and latches ===
Electric mortise and cylindrical locks are drop-in replacements for door-mounted mechanical locks. An additional hole must be drilled in the door for electric power wires. Also, a power transfer hinge is often used to get the power from the door frame to the door. Electric mortise and cylindrical locks allow mechanical free egress, and can be either fail unlocked or fail locked. In the US, UL rated doors must retain their rating: in new construction doors are cored and then rated. but in retrofits, the doors must be re-rated.

Electrified exit hardware, sometimes called "panic hardware" or "crash bars", are used in fire exit applications. A person wishing to exit pushes against the bar to open the door, making it the easiest of mechanically-free exit methods. Electrified exit hardware can be either fail unlocked or fail locked. A drawback of electrified exit hardware is their complexity, which requires skill to install and maintenance to assure proper function. Only hardware labeled "Fire Exit Hardware" can be installed on fire listed doors and frames and must meet both panic exit listing standards and fire listing standards.

Motor-operated locks are used throughout Europe. A European motor-operated lock has two modes, day mode where only the latch is electrically operated, and night mode where the more secure deadbolt is electrically operated.

In South Korea, most homes and apartments have installed electronic locks, which are currently replacing the lock systems in older homes. South Korea mainly uses a lock system by Gateman.

=== Passive electronic lock ===
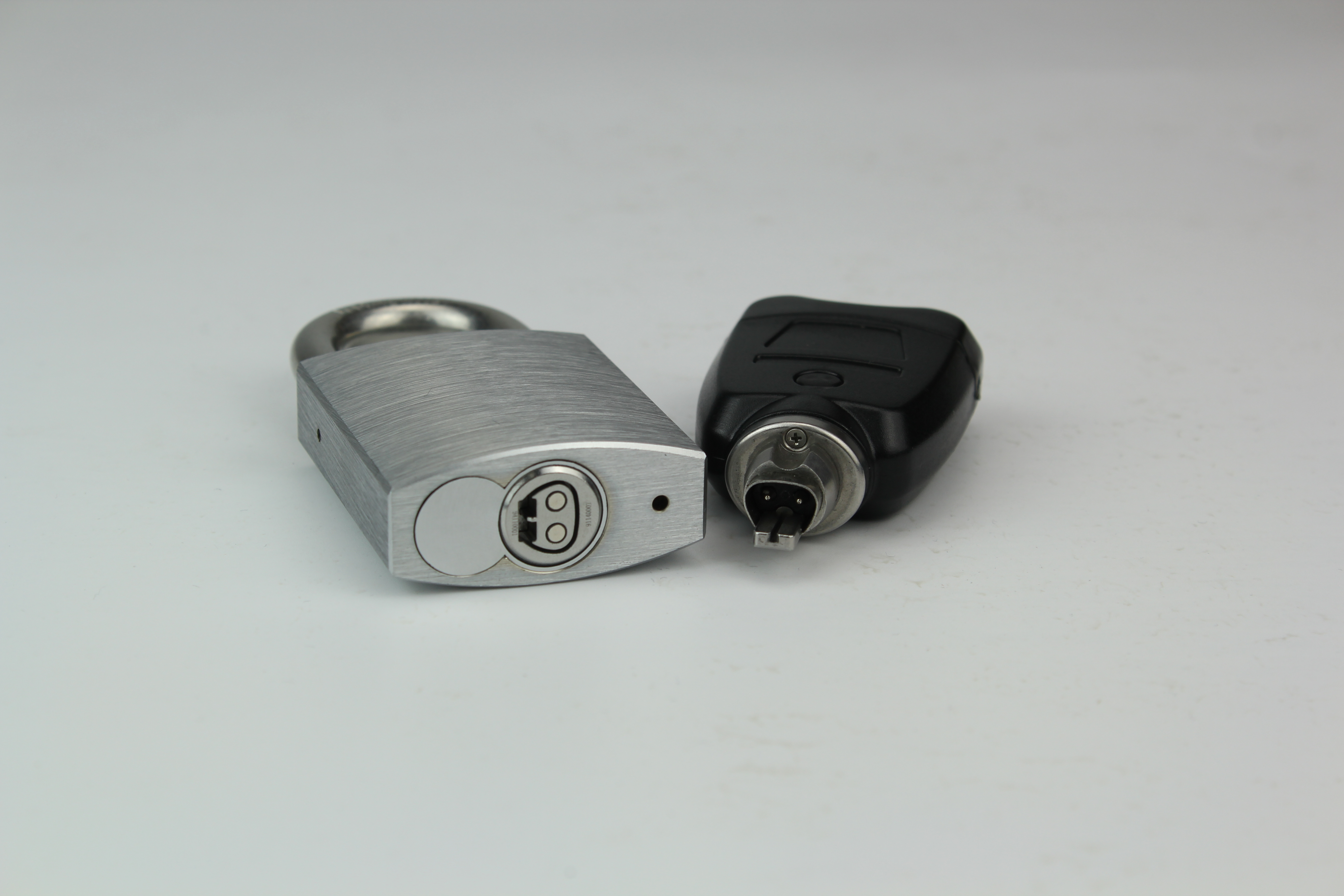
Passive electronic padlock

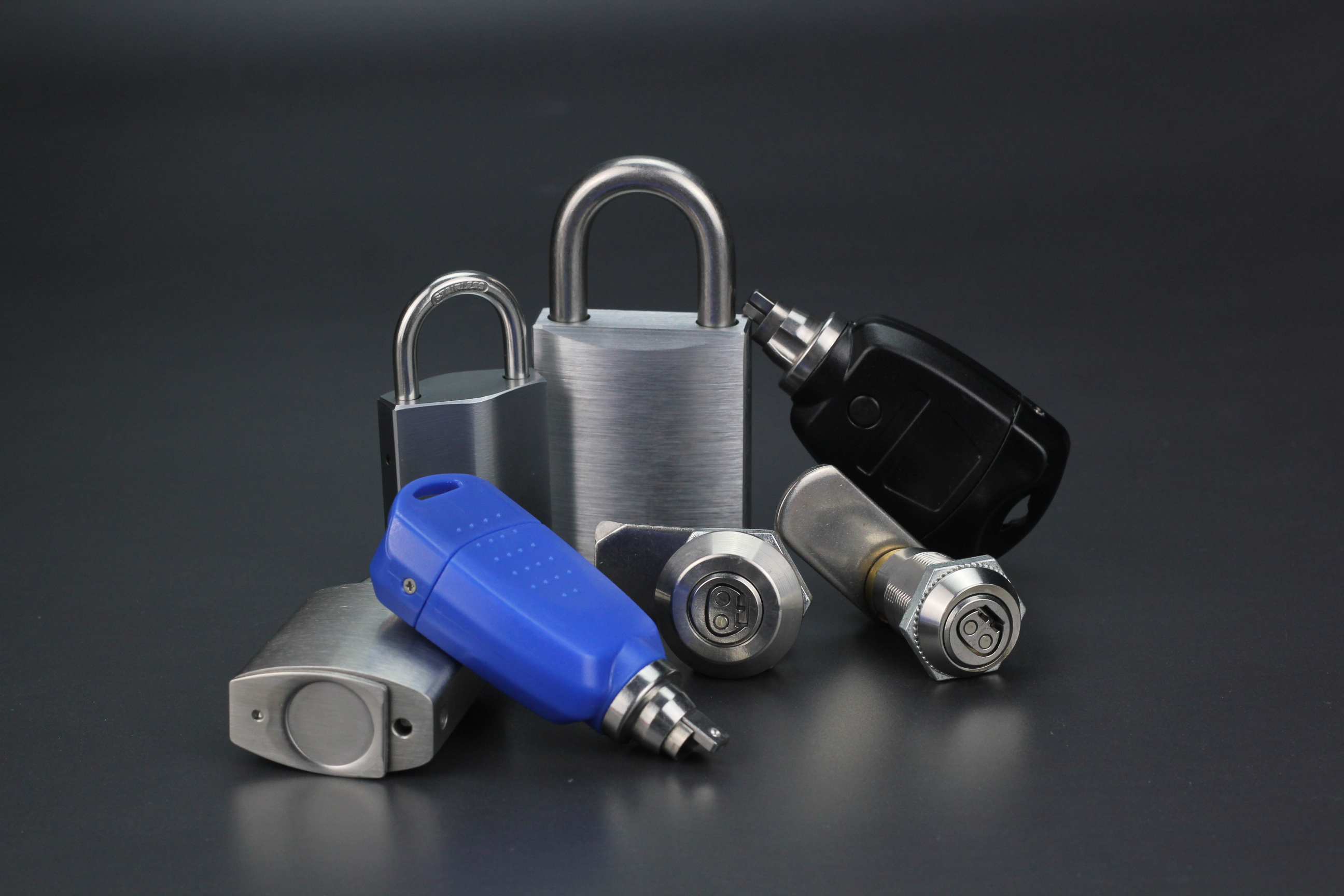
Passive electronic lock system

The "passive" in passive electronic locks means no power supply. Like electronic deadbolts, it is a drop-in replacement for mechanical locks. But the difference is that passive electronic locks do not require wiring and are easy to install.

The passive electronic lock integrates a miniature electronic single-chip microcomputer. There is no mechanical keyhole, only three metal contacts are retained. When unlocking, insert the electronic key into the keyhole of the passive electronic lock, that is, the three contacts on the head end of the key are in contact with the three contacts on the passive electronic lock. At this time, the key will supply power to the passive electronic lock, and at the same time, read the ID number of the passive electronic lock for verification. When the verification is passed, the key will power the coil in the passive electronic lock. The coil generates a magnetic field and drives the magnet in the passive electronic lock to unlock. At the moment, turn the key to drive the mechanical structure in the passive electronic lock to unlock the lock body. After successful unlocking, the key records the ID number of the passive electronic lock and also records the time of unlocking the passive electronic lock. Passive electronic locks can only be unlocked by a key with unlocking authority, and unlocking will fail if there is no unlocking authority.

Passive electronic locks are currently used in a number of specialized fields, such as power utilities, water utilities, public safety, transportation, data centers, etc.

=== Programmable lock ===
The programmable electronic lock system is realized by programmable keys, electronic locks and software. When the identification code of the key matches the identification code of the lock, all available keys are operated to unlock. The internal structure of the lock contains a cylinder, which has a contact (lock slot) that is in contact with the key, and a part of it is an electronic control device to store and verify the received identification code and respond (whether it is unlocked). The key contains a power supply device, usually a rechargeable battery or a replaceable battery in the key, used to drive the system to work; it also includes an electronic storage and control device for storing the identification code of the lock.

The software is used to set and modify the data of each key and lock.

Using this type of key and lock control system does not need to change user habits. In addition, compared with the previous mechanical device, its advantage is that only one key can open multiple locks instead of a bunch of keys like the current one. A single key can contain many lock identification codes; which can set the unlock permission for a single user.

== Authentication methods ==
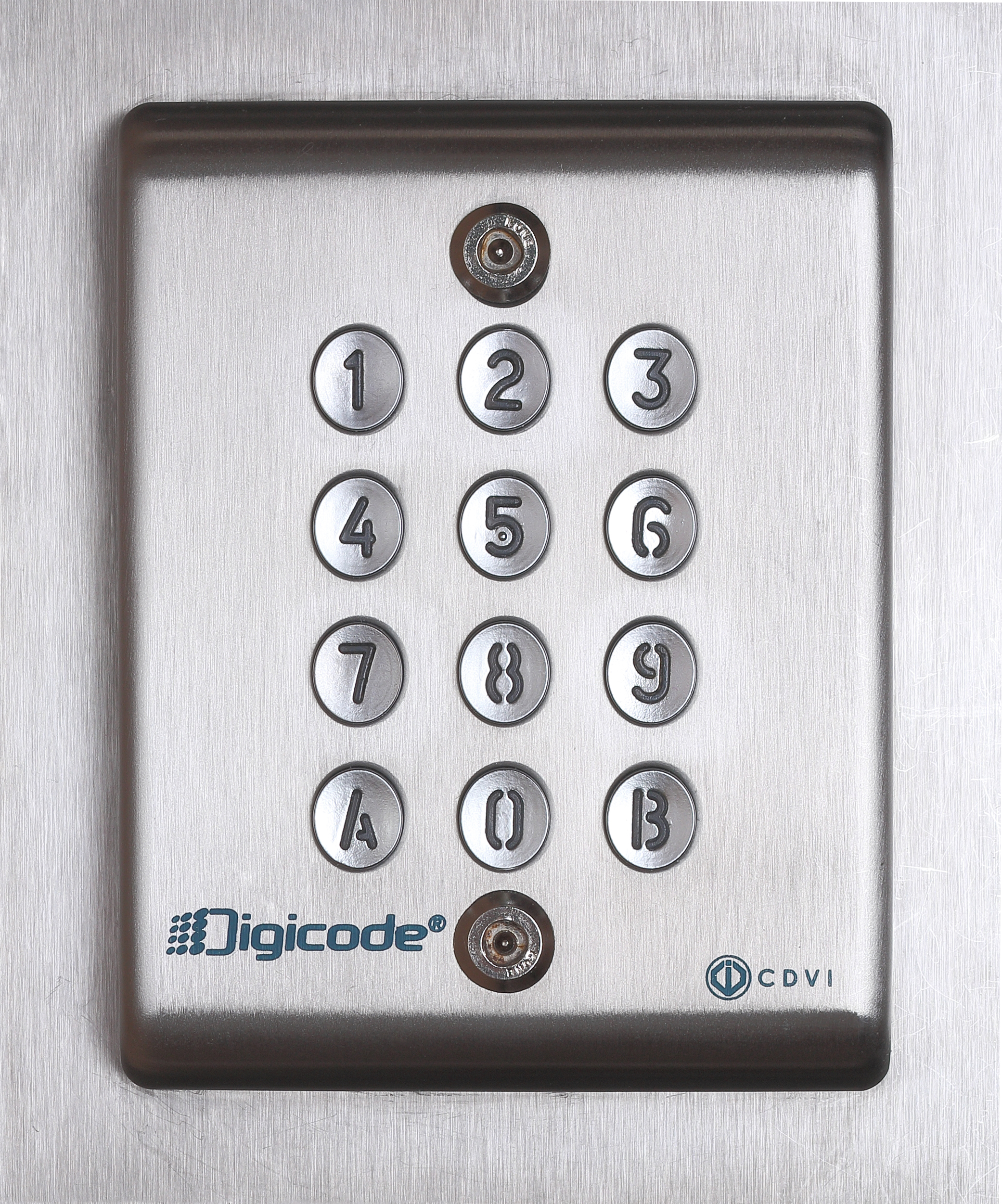
Simple PIN electronic lock securing an elevator

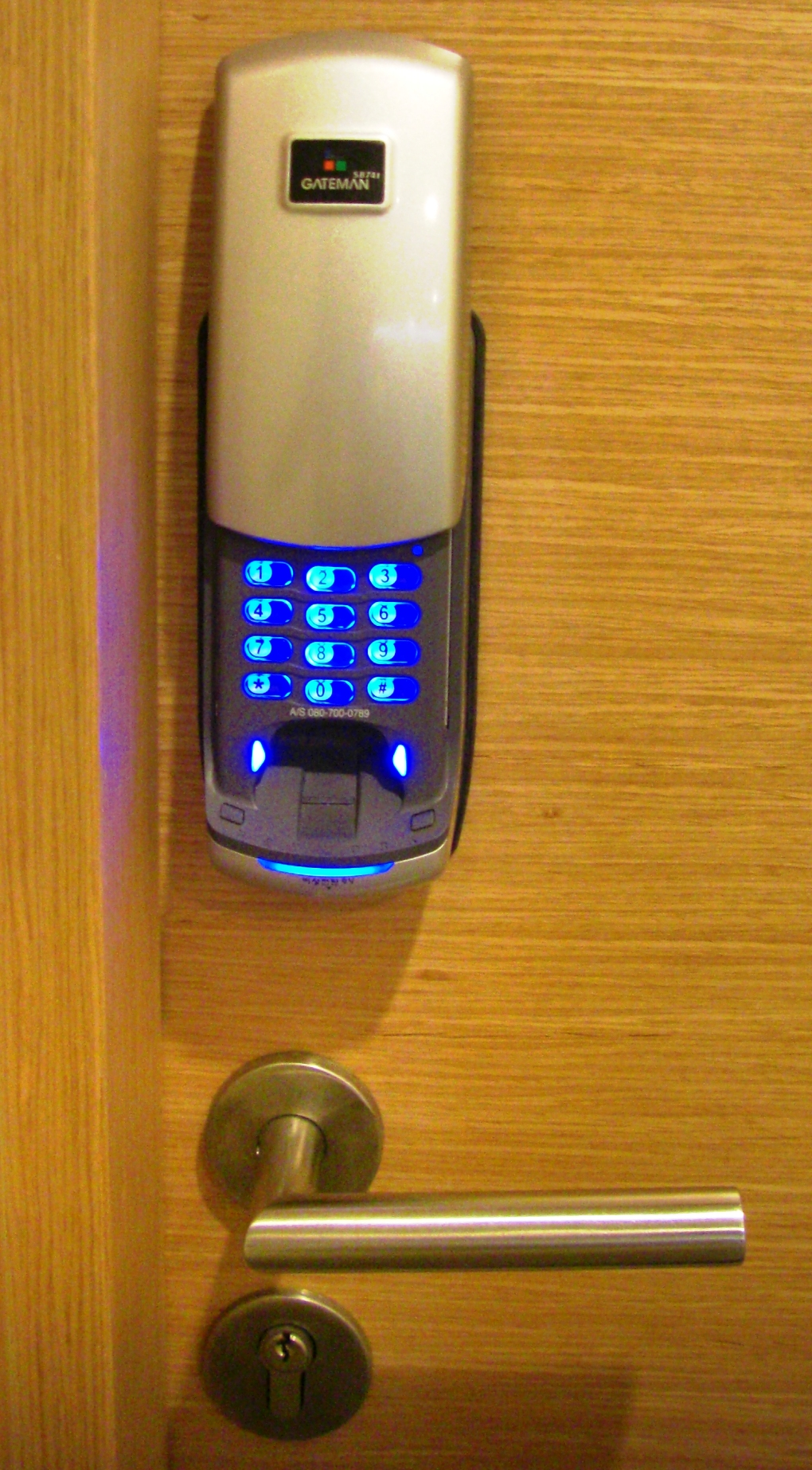
A biometric electronic lock with PIN entry

A feature of electronic locks is that the locks can deactivated or opened by authentication, without the use of a traditional physical key:

=== Numerical codes, passwords, and passphrases ===
Perhaps the most common form of electronic lock uses a keypad to enter a numerical code or password for authentication. Some feature an audible response to each press. Combination lengths are usually between four and six digits long.

=== Security tokens ===
Another means of authenticating users is to require them to scan or "swipe" a security token such as a smart card or similar, or to interact a token with the lock. For example, some locks can access stored credentials on a personal digital assistant (PDA) or smartphone, by using infrared, Bluetooth, or NFC data transfer methods.

=== Biometrics ===
As biometrics become more and more prominent as a recognized means of positive identification, their use in security systems increases. Some electronic locks take advantage of technologies such as fingerprint scanning, retinal scanning, iris scanning and voice print identification to authenticate users.

=== RFID ===
Radio-frequency identification (RFID) is the use of an object (typically referred to as an "RFID tag") applied to or incorporated into a product, animal, or person for the purpose of identification and tracking using radio waves. Some tags can be read from several meters away and beyond the line of sight of the reader. This technology is also used in some modern electronic locks. Electronic locks may combine multiple authentication methods within a single system. The technology has been approved since before the 1970s, but has become much more prevalent in recent years due to its usages in things like global supply chain management and pet microchipping.

== See also ==
- Access badge
- Common Access Card (CAC)
- Credential
- Electric strike
- Electromagnetic lock
- Keycard
- Physical security
