= Ivan Strack =

Russian serial killer

- Born: Ivan Igorevich Strack; 1990 (age 35–36); Vyborg, Leningrad Oblast, RSFSR
- Other names: "Vyborg maniac" "Leningrad maniac" "Tula maniac" Vanya
- Conviction: Murder
- Penalty: Involuntary commitment (2006); 22 years imprisonment (2018)

Details
- Victims: 4
- Span of crimes: 2004–2017
- Country: Russia
- States: Leningrad, Tula
- Date apprehended: 2005; 8 July 2017

Ivan Igorevich Strack (Russian: Иван Игоревич Штрак; born 1990), known as the Leningrad Maniac (Russian: Ленинградский маньяк, romanized: Leningradskiy manyak), is a Russian serial killer, responsible for the murders of his grandfather and two underage girls in 2004 and 2005, while he was still a minor. Judged unfit to stand trial, he was kept in a psychiatric institution until 2017.

Shortly after his release, he committed another murder and was later sentenced to 22 years in that case.

== Early life ==
Ivan Strack was born in Vyborg in 1990 into a family with German roots. His father abandoned the family in the late 1990s, leaving the young man to live with his mother and older brother, a security guard. At school, he was described as a handsome, well-mannered boy with a nerdy appearance, although a rather quiet one. In November 2004, his mother died suddenly, and little Ivan was taken under the care of his older brother, who took full custody of him.

== Initial murders ==
=== Ekaterina Shkurko and Anna Shibaeva ===
As a teenager, Strack studied at the No. 10 Secondary School in Vyborg, where he started having intimate feelings towards 13-year-old Ekaterina Shkurko, a fellow student. He often invited her to go on walks and even visited her apartment, but when Strack asked her if she would become his girlfriend, she refused. Following the refusal, the pair stopped seeing each other for some time.

On the evening of 6 March 2005, Strack called Shkurko and asked her to meet him. The girl showed up alongside 11-year-old Anna Shibaeva, with whom she had been spending time at a slide near her house. Strack then took the two girls to a nearby wooded area on the outskirts of the neighbourhood, which local residents used as a park. While walking, Strack again asked Shkurko to be his girlfriend and even promised to give her an expensive gift for International Women's Day, but she again refused.

Upon hearing this, Strack attacked her, and despite Shkurko fiercely resisting, he took out a knife and stabbed her ten times in the face, neck and back. Shibaeva tried to escape, but Strack managed to catch up with her, whereupon he threw her into the snow and stabbed her four times. After killing them, he stole both of the girls' cell phones. The two bodies were discovered on the early morning of the following day by Nikolai Kirilenko, a retired military doctor who was on his way to visiting his dacha.

That same evening, Strack was arrested in the family apartment - when authorities searched the place, they found Shibaeva's phone in his possession. A few hours later, Shkurko's phone was found at a local pawnbroker to whom Strack had sold the item a few hours prior to his arrest. When questioned, the young man willingly confessed to the murders and actively participated in recreating the crime scenes, but also unexpectedly admitted to another murder.

=== Andrei Strack ===
On 6 December 2004, Strack's grandfather, 64-year-old Andrei Andreyevich Strack, was found stabbed to death at his apartment. He had a long criminal history in Vyborg, with a rap sheet dating back to the mid-1960s. In the Soviet era, Strack was repeatedly imprisoned for hooliganism, possession of weapons and illicit drugs. In the late 1980s, after the passage of the "On Cooperation" law (Russian: О кооперации) and the blossoming of the cooperative movement, whose protection and racketeering brought large profits, Andrei Strack created his own gang that soon took over a number of cafés and businesses in Vyborg. Following the dissolution of the Soviet Union, Andrei started a legitimate business.

Ivan claimed that on the day of his grandfather's murder, he went to his apartment to return videocassettes with movies and to borrow a batch of others to watch. During dinner, he supposedly broke a plate of buckwheat porridge on the floor, after which his grandfather became enraged and started insulting not only him but also his father and allegedly his recently deceased mother. After cleaning up the room, Ivan took a long knife from the kitchen, approached his grandfather from behind while he was sitting on the sofa and stabbed him several times in the neck and back, hitting the occipital lobe. According to Ivan, his grandfather fell from the sofa onto the floor, still alive, but he later succumbed to his injuries. Andrei Strack's body was later discovered by his brother, Nikolai, who was visiting him along with his wife Nelly.

==== Questions of guilt ====
Following Ivan's confession about killing his grandfather, Nikolai and Nelly Strack claimed that it was untrue. According to them, Andrei, despite his advanced age, was 180 cm tall and weighed 120 kg, which, in their view, made him more than capable of resisting his 14-year-old grandson. However, during the investigation, law enforcement found circumstantial evidence linking Ivan to the murder.

It was proven that Ivan did indeed visit him on the indicated date, as witnesses reported seeing the teenager near the house and a phone call he had with his grandfather confirmed this. In addition to this, investigators established that there were no signs of a break-in, as the front door to the apartment had to be opened via a remote control and was equipped with maglocks and a peephole camera. Due to these heightened security measures, they came to the conclusion that Andrei had let the killer into the apartment, as he was well acquainted with them. Finally, robbery was ruled out as well, as a massive gold chain, an expensive watch and two signet rings were found near Andrei's body.

== Trial and internment ==
In mid-2005, Ivan was charged with the three murders. In interviews with investigators, he claimed that he killed the two girls to steal the expensive cellphone equipped with a video camera that he always wanted. However, this motive was considered suspicious, as his family was financially secure and his grandfather was known for giving him really expensive gifts.

In late 2005, at the request of his lawyers, Strack was ordered to undergo a forensic psychiatric evaluation. The results deemed that he was incapable of standing trial, and in January 2006, he was acquitted by reason of insanity and interned at a psychiatric facility with intensive supervision.

Every six months, Strack was examined by a special medical commission that determined the state of his mental health. He remained in intensive care until 2012 when the commission concluded that he had improved noticeably and was thus eligible for outpatient care. After reviewing the documents provided by the hospital, the Vyborg City Court agreed to discharge Strack and he was subsequently released.

Ivan's older brother was convicted of murdering a cab driver in 2008, strangling him because he supposedly had no money to pay the fare. Because of this, Strack moved to Tula with his aunt Lydia, where he was registered with a psychiatrist and continued to take his prescribed medication.

== Murder of Ekaterina Frolova ==
=== Acquaintance and relationship ===
After his release, Strack lived a secluded lifestyle, working as a cellphone repairman at a shopping centre in Tula. In March 2017, he quit his job so he could operate from home. Officially unemployed, he wanted to start a business with a 400,000 ruble loan for business development, but none of his friends agreed to lend him the money.

In early 2017, while still working at the shopping centre, he befriended 19-year-old Ekaterina Frolova, for whom he eventually started developing romantic feelings. Despite his various attempts to court her, Frolova rebuffed Strack as she was not interested in him in that way. Strack himself would later say that they mostly interacted via social media, and almost always in relation to him fixing various appliances. On at least two occasions, he supposedly did it for free.

=== Murder ===
On 8 July 2017, Frolova again asked Strack for help - this time for repairing the cellphone of a mutual acquaintance, 19-year-old Anastasia Khlebnikova, who was going to come to Ekaterina's apartment in the evening to collect her phone. After meeting around 4 PM, Strack and Frolova went to her apartment on Kalinina Street.

In Strack's account, he claimed that Frolova owed him approximately 6,000 rubles from previous repairs and, combined with this one, it amounted to 10,000. Frolova allegedly disagreed with the price and called him "crooked", which angered him. The two started arguing, but in the midst of their dispute, Strack grabbed a folding knife and proceeded to stab her ten times in the back and neck. Aware that Khlebnikova was going to arrive soon, Strack closed the room where he killed Frolova and turned off the lights in the apartment to obscure any traces of the crime scene.

A few minutes later, Khlebnikova arrived at the apartment block with her boyfriend but decided to enter the residence by herself. Strack opened the door for her and lied that Frolova was taking a bath, beckoning Khlebnikova to come inside. As soon as she entered and turned her back against him, Strack stabbed her in the back, causing Khlebnikova to fall to the floor. Once on the ground, he stabbed her twelve additional times around the head area, but the injuries were non-fatal and she remained conscious. Strack then dragged the semi-conscious woman into the kitchen, where, at knifepoint, she put two iPhones, a laptop and money belonging to both her and Frolova into a bag. After she finished, Strack proceeded to stab her 13 more times in areas with vital organs, but miraculously, Khlebnikova endured and pretended to be dead.

Convinced she was dead, Strack then ransacked the apartment, stealing property worth 51,931 rubles and 20 kopecks. He then opened five gas burners on the stove in an attempt to cause an explosion and destroy all evidence, before finally leaving. About 40 minutes later, Khlebnikova's boyfriend decided to see what was going on, but upon entering the corridor, he noticed blood coming out from the front door to Frolova's apartment. He then got inside, shut off the gas burners, called the emergency services and gave Khlebnikova first aid. She was subsequently driven to the hospital and placed into intensive care, where she managed to survive her injuries.

When queried by investigators later on, Khlebnikova claimed that during the attack, Strack maintained complete composure and self-control, but did not make any demands of her. Instead, she willingly offered to give him the money, but he instead continued stabbing her.

== Arrest, trial and imprisonment ==
During the attempted murder of Khlebnikova, Strack accidentally stabbed himself in the hand. Due to the severe blood loss, he had to go to the trauma centre at the Vanykinskaya Hospital on the same evening. As the police notified all medical institutions about the case, staff who found Strack's behaviour suspicious reported him to the police, who detained him only a few minutes after the call was placed. During the interrogation that followed, Strack readily admitted responsibility for the murder of Frolova and the attempted murder of Khlebnikova, after which a criminal case was initiated against him.

In the midst of the investigation, Strack's lawyers filed a motion for a forensic psychiatric evaluation, which was granted. In late 2017, he was transferred to the Serbsky Center in Moscow, where specialists worked on him for the next two months. In February 2018, much to the objection of Strack and his aunt, he was declared sane to stand trial.

The trial began in early August 2018. During the proceedings, prosecutors presented material evidence such as the victim's belongings; Strack's bloodied personal items; details of phone calls; fragments of wallpaper and linoleum from the crime scene; the murder weapon and even skin flaps recovered from Frolova's body. Invoking Article 51 of the Criminal Code, Strack refused to incriminate himself, but one of the testimonies he had given to an investigator on a previous occasion was read out. He directly participated in the trial, answering questions from the judge, his lawyers and the state prosecutor, but categorically refused to communicate with the relatives of his victims.

On 27 August 2018, Strack was found guilty on charges of murder, aggravated robbery and attempted murder, for which he was given 22 years in a strict-regime penal colony. The court also ordered that he pay a total sum of 1,500,000 rubles in damages. His lawyer quickly submitted an appeal, but the Tula Regional Court denied it in December of that year, leaving the sentence unchanged.

== Current status ==
Following his conviction, there has been no reliable information about Strack. In August 2023, a number of media outlets reported that he had signed a contract with the Ministry of Defence and that he had been sent off to participate in the Russian invasion of Ukraine, where he supposedly died in combat in mid-2023. However, this claim has never been verified.

== See also ==
- List of Russian serial killers
