= Tank phone =

Phone on armoured vehicle exteriors for use by infantry

A tank phone (also called a tank telephone, grunt phone, tank-infantry phone, TIP, infantry tank telephone, ITT, or infantry phone) is a telephone mounted on the exterior of armoured vehicles to facilitate communication between people outside of the vehicle and those inside, whilst avoiding the tank crew becoming exposed to enemy fire.

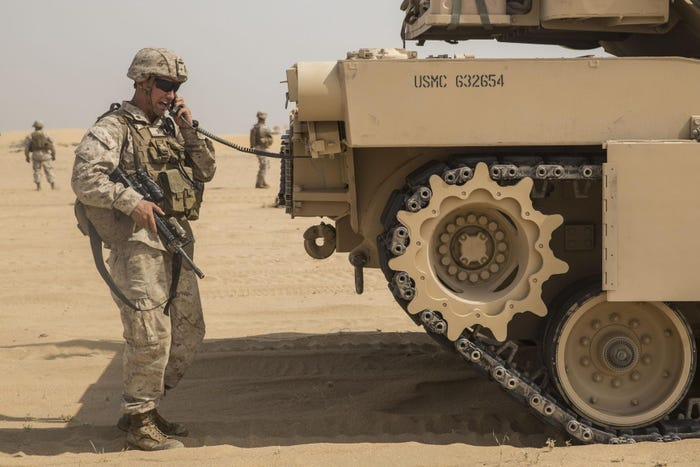
US Marine talking on a "grunt phone"

== Purpose ==
Communication between infantry and tanks may be possible via radio and other means. However, it is more efficient and reliable to provide a tank phone mounted typically on the rear of the tank in a small box that contains a standard telephone handset which infantrymen may use to speak directly to the tank commander. Infantrymen may thus direct the tank's fire, which they are better placed to do as the tank crew will typically have their vision impeded by being buttoned up within the tank. The typical method of doing this is using the present direction of the tank gun as a reference point and moving it onto the target from there using up/down left/right commands, though clock-references may also be used.

== History ==
=== British Commonwealth forces ===
During the First World War British Mk. I Tanks were fitted with telephone equipment whereby the tank would lay a telephone wire behind it so that the tank-crew could communicate with friendly forces behind it. A crude field telephone was carried by the Mk. I tank for use with this, and the wire was hundreds of metres in length. However, this did not work very well and whilst the tanks were initially fitted with this equipment, it was rarely used.

British commonwealth forces used tank phones during the Second World War. For example Australian Matilda II close-support tanks deployed on the Tarakan island were equipped with them. British tanks deployed in the Normandy campaign in 1944 were also equipped with them, though they were often knocked out of action as they were exposed to artillery and mortar fire. The Churchill IV tank first fielded in 1943 and VII tanks also came with infantry telephones mounted as standard. The Comet also came equipped with a telephone box mounted on the rear hull of the tank (in later Finnish service this was replaced with a Finnish army model).

The Chieftain tank included a rear-mounted telephone box. All British main battle tanks deployed as of 2002 included tank phones mounted so as to avoid the need for infantrymen to climb on the tank hull to speak with the crew.

=== United States ===
Most tanks fielded by the US Army and US Marines between the M4 Sherman and the M1 Abrams included an infantry phone.

The first US armoured vehicles to have tank phones attached to them were M4 Shermans deployed during the 1943 Bougainville islands campaign, where tank-crews mounted field telephones to the rear of their tanks housed typically in ammunition cans that were linked to the tank's internal intercom system. A variation on this had the phone connected to the tank by a long wire trailing to a distant phone where infantrymen could use it without exposing themselves to enemy fire. Americans deployed to Europe also made similar modifications to their tanks. During the battle of Tarawa, deployed Sherman M4 tanks carried infantry phones housed in rear-mounted bags. Tanks deployed to Iwo Jima also included infantry phones.

M4A3 Shermans deployed during the Korean war included tanks with phones housed in rear-mounted boxes. M26 tanks in Korea included tank phones, however these were criticised for being mounted too high up on the rear deck such that infantrymen had to stand up to use it, thus exposing themselves to fire, and easily became damaged. M26 tank phones also proved less effective due to a lack of familiarity with their use amongst US personnel.

US Marine Corps M48A3 tanks deployed during the Vietnam war included infantry phones, including those with a 35-foot extension cord to allow the infantryman to stand away from the tank whilst directing fire. In the "Mod B" program these were raised and moved away from the rear mud-guard as to avoid it becoming tangled with undergrowth whilst the tank was driving through thick jungle.

Unlike previous US tanks, including the M60, the M1 Abrams tanks originally lacked a tank-phone. This meant that communication with local infantry necessitated allocation a radio frequency for communication with them. The infantry phone was thought to lead to infantrymen speaking on it becoming exposed and a target for enemy forces. This caused problems due to the loud noise of the AGT1500 gas turbine engine of the Abrams making it hard for infantry to make themselves heard whilst talking to tank crews, and exposing the tank crew to enemy fire. This deficiency was fixed in 2006 with the TUSK (Tank Urban Survivability Kit) upgrade to the M1 Abrams that was implemented during the Iraq war, which included a tank phone mounted on the rear of the tank above the right track.

== See also ==
- Courtesy phone
- Intercom
- Land mobile radio system
- Mobile radio
- Walkie-talkie
