= Wireless intercom =

A wireless intercom is a telecommunications device that enables voice communication without the need to run copper wires between intercom stations. A wired intercom system may incorporate Wireless elements.

There are many types of wireless intercom systems on the market. Most wireless intercom systems communicate by radio waves using one of the frequencies allotted by various government agencies. Some wireless intercom systems communicate using the 802.11 standard. There are also systems that advertise themselves as wireless, but communicate over existing building AC electrical wiring.

== Basic terms ==
- Station - A wireless intercom unit.
- Outdoor Intercom - This is an intercom that can be placed by a building's doors and it operates like a doorbell, but people inside can talk to the visitor.
- Channels - Some wireless intercom systems have more than one channel so private conversations can occur between groups of intercoms.
- Range - This is the maximum range an intercom will communicate under ideal conditions. Ideal conditions mean no obstructions between units.
- Monitor - Usually this means the ability to listen to what is happening at a wireless intercom unit.
- Conference - The ability to talk to multiple intercom units at once.
- Paging - Paging function enables you to broadcast to all the stations in the location.

== Wired vs. Wireless ==
One reason to use a wireless intercom system is that the cost of retrofitting a building for a wired intercom system is high. Another reason is the increased portability of a wireless system. With battery-powered radio frequency wireless intercom units, a person can carry a station as they walk around.

One of the challenges of a wireless system is the possibility of interference. Radio frequency wireless systems may get interference from other wireless devices. Some wireless intercom designs reduce this interference by using "digital spread spectrum".

=== Encrypted wireless ===
Wired intercom is inherently private, so long as the wiring system isn't tapped by outside parties. Wireless intercom is not inherently private; conversations on a wireless intercom are broadcast using publicly available wireless frequencies which means other users with similar devices could listen in if they are within range. Most units on the market will allow intercom conversations to be heard through other devices such as scanners, baby monitors, cordless telephones, or the same brand of wireless intercom.

Wireless intercom privacy can be provided if the audio stream is encrypted. Telex, HME, Altair and other intercom manufacturers offer encrypted wireless intercom for corporate, military and sports team customers desiring instant voice communications with privacy. The first use of encrypted wireless intercom in American football was in 1996; by 1999 it was being used in the Super Bowl. Audio frequency response of current products is limited to less than 4 kHz; this means that natural vocal sibilances above 4 kHz are absent. Ess sounds like eff, requiring additional spoken clarification such as saying "'S' as in 'Sam'".

== U.S. & Canada Wireless Frequencies ==
The United States and Canada have several frequency ranges for wireless intercom systems and other wireless products. They are 49 MHz, FM band (160–270 kHz), 900 MHz, 2.4 GHz, 5.8 GHz, and MURS (150 MHz). The frequency that will work best for an application depends on the wireless devices already in use not only in the building itself, but also in surrounding buildings. For instance, if a residence is using wireless networking which operates in the 2.4 GHz range, a wireless intercom that operates in this range may interfere with the network and vice versa. Ideally, the best intercom for an application would be one that is in a frequency not in use in the surrounding area, or one that uses digital spread spectrum to reduce possibility of interference.

== Systems that use existing electrical cabling ==
The first intercom systems communicated over a set of low-voltage signal wires installed in the walls of a building. The installation was typically done during the building’s construction, but buildings could be retrofitted with communication wires, at a cost. Non-radio "wireless" intercom designs were developed that used a building's existing electrical wiring to carry communication signals. Such systems work similarly to normal wired intercom designs, with intercom stations using wires to connect to electrical outlets in rooms. This method of intercom connection is most useful in offices and homes served by a single electrical service. Products are available from a variety of manufacturers including Westinghouse and GE.
