= Electric strike =

Electromechanical door lock allowing remote access control via an electrical signal

An electric strike is an access control device used for door frames. It replaces the fixed strike faceplate often used with a latch (also known as a keeper). ANSI/BHMA A156.31 – Standard for Electric Strikes and Frame Mounted Actuators is a US industry specification defining operations and testing of electric strikes.

== Description ==
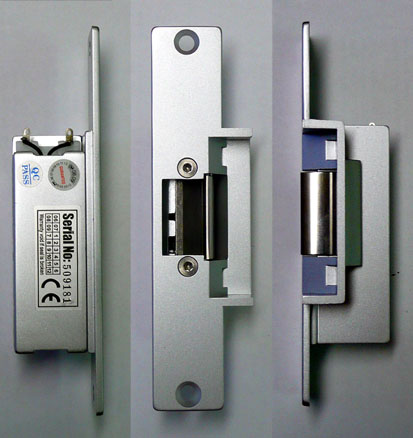
Electric strike

Like a fixed strike plate, an electric strike plate normally presents a ramped or beveled surface to the locking latch allowing the door to close and latch just like a fixed strike would. However, an electric strike's ramped surface can, upon command, pivot out of the way when the lock on the door is in the locked position and the door is opened, allowing a user to pull/push the door to open it without operating the mechanical lock or using a mechanical key. After the door is opened past the keeper, the keeper returns it to its standard position and re-locks when power is removed or applied, depending upon the strike's configuration.

== Variations ==
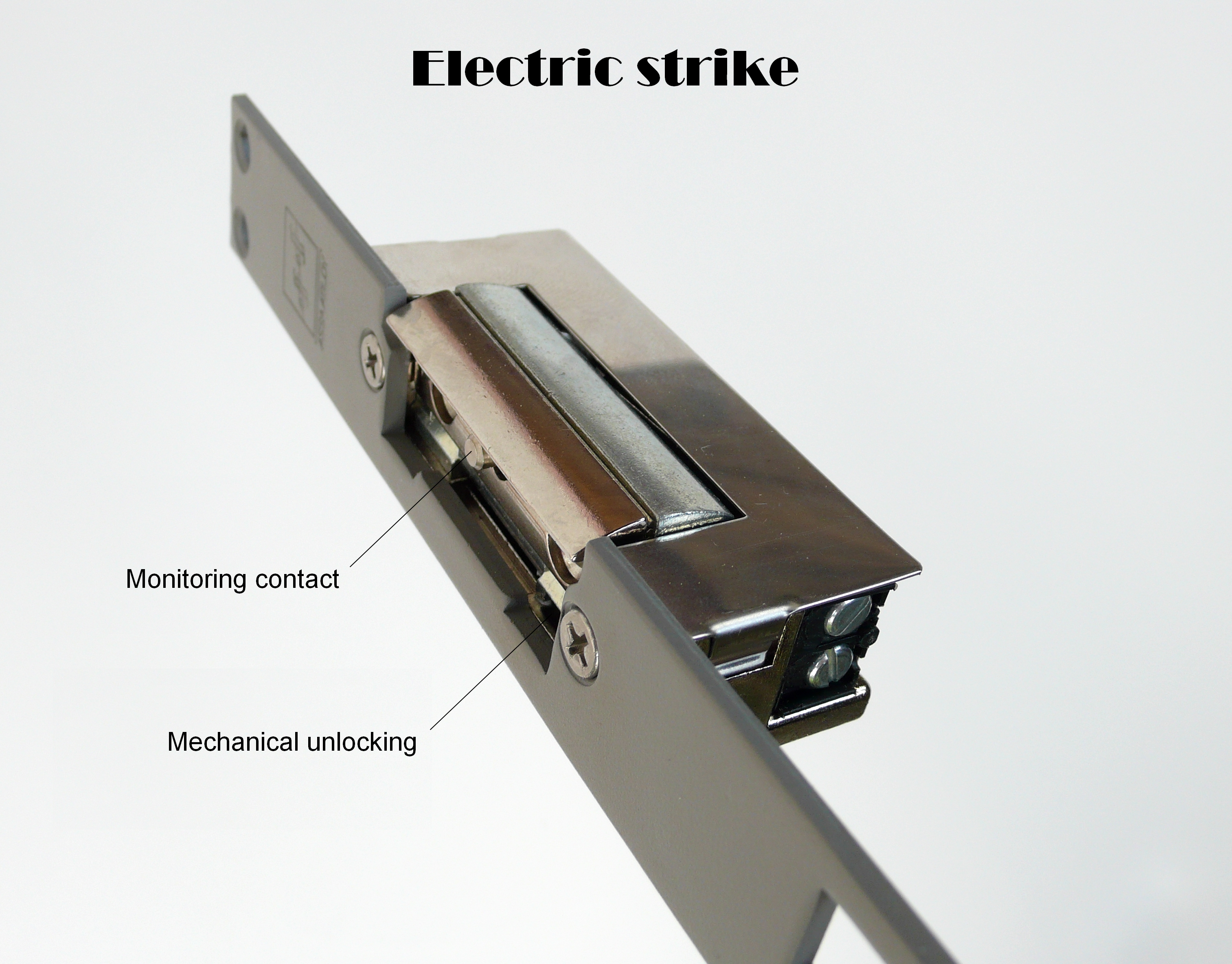
Electric strike with monitoring contact

Electric strikes are generally available in two configurations:

- Fail-secure. Also called fail-locked or non-fail safe. In this configuration, applying electric current to the strike will cause it to unlock. In this configuration, the strike would remain locked in a power failure, but typically the mechanical lock can still be used to open the door from the inside for egress from the secure side. These units can be powered by alternating current, which will cause the unit to buzz, or DC power, which offers silent operation, except for a "click" while the unit is powered.
  - Hold-open. In this configuration, an electric current is applied to the strike, causing it to unlock and remain unlocked until it is used. As soon as the strike has been used, it goes back to standard locked position. This is used in many residential, commercial and industrial applications. The Hold-open function eases usage because the powering of the strike and the opening of the strike do not need to be exactly synchronized.
- Fail-safe. Also called fail-open. In this configuration, applying electric current to the strike will cause it to lock. It operates the same as a magnetic lock would. If there is a power failure, the door opens merely by being pushed or pulled.

A new trend is a strike that is quickly field-installation reversible from fail safe to fail secure (and back again if needed). Some manufacturers require the opening of the solenoids, but others allow the reversing of the function within seconds (usually take less than 10 seconds) with only the movement of two external screws or a mechanical unlocking accessory which is directly accessible when the door is open. This is exactly the same principle as a child safety door lock which is installed on car doors.

Electric strikes on AC may allow someone outside the door to hear when the door is unlocked. A buzzing noise is typically made by applying alternating current (AC) to the strike instead of direct current (DC). When using a DC powered strike, the sound is a faint click, which may be almost imperceptible.

There are many manufacturers of electric strikes, and there are many things that have to be considered when buying one, i.e., type of jamb, type of locking hardware, whether one requires fail-secure, fail-safe or hold-open function, length of the latch, depth of jamb, voltage requirements and the length of the faceplate. Only in fail-safe situations, it is also a good option to choose a magnetic lock as a backup to secure the door.

Before using a magnetic lock, the fire marshal or appropriate authority should be consulted. There are emergency egress issues that must be addressed before using a magnetic lock.

== Types of electric strikes by locking device ==
Electric strikes can be differentiated in a number of ways, including frame type in which it is to be installed, choice of continuous or intermittent duty, and type of locking mechanism on the door in which it is intended to work. The four most common locking mechanisms concerned with electric strikes are cylindrical, deadbolt, mortise, and rim panic exit devices. Cylindrical electric strikes are generally the cheapest due to their use in residential markets. Deadbolts, also known as deadlocks, do not have a spring mechanism which generally means the strike for a deadbolt is "hold" only (the deadbolt is thrown and it engages in the electric strike cavity; the electric strike can release it but cannot subsequently "recapture" it, since the deadbolt lacks the spring latching capability of the other lock sets).

There are specialty electric strikes that hold the electric strike keeper open until the door with the extended deadbolt closes back into the electric strike to "recapture" the extended deadbolt. Mortise type locksets tend towards larger projecting latches from the door to engage deeper in the frame, and electric strikes used for these locking mechanisms require more cutting and space in the frame. Rim exit devices (panic bars or crash bars) are required in many buildings as a "single motion" means of egress, and electric strikes used in these situations are typically different from electric strikes designed for other situations.

=== Rim panic electric strikes ===
Electric strikes for rim panic exit devices are sometimes, though not always, "no cut" electric strikes - no cutting, in reference to a rim panic strike, means the strike is bolted to the surface of jamb without cutting into the frame or modifying it in any way (except for the drilling and tapping of mounting screw and/or anchoring pins). There are also specialty electric strikes used in vertical rod exit devices; the exit device's bottom rod is usually deactivated and the specialty electric strike is mounted at the top of the door frame to work with the top latch of the vertical rod exit device.
