= Courtesy telephone =

Telephone used in travel hubs

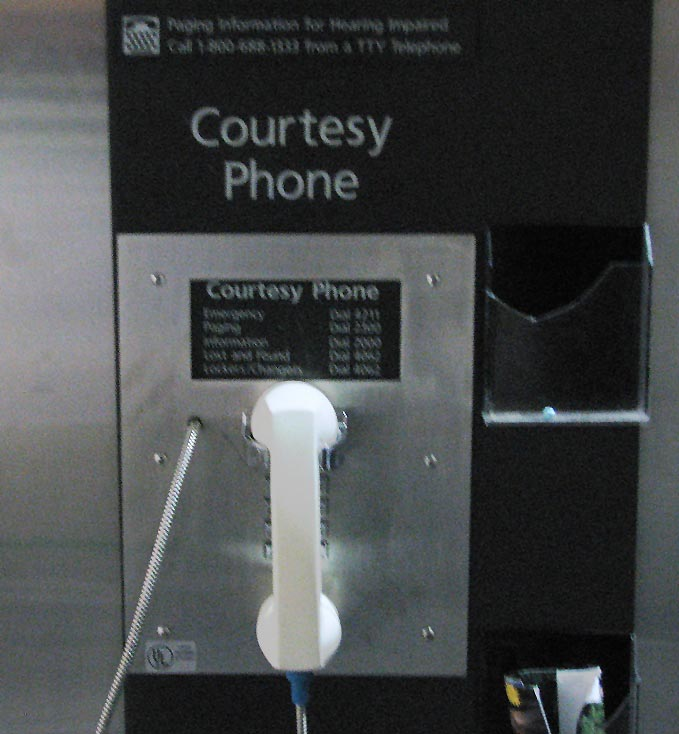
A white courtesy telephone

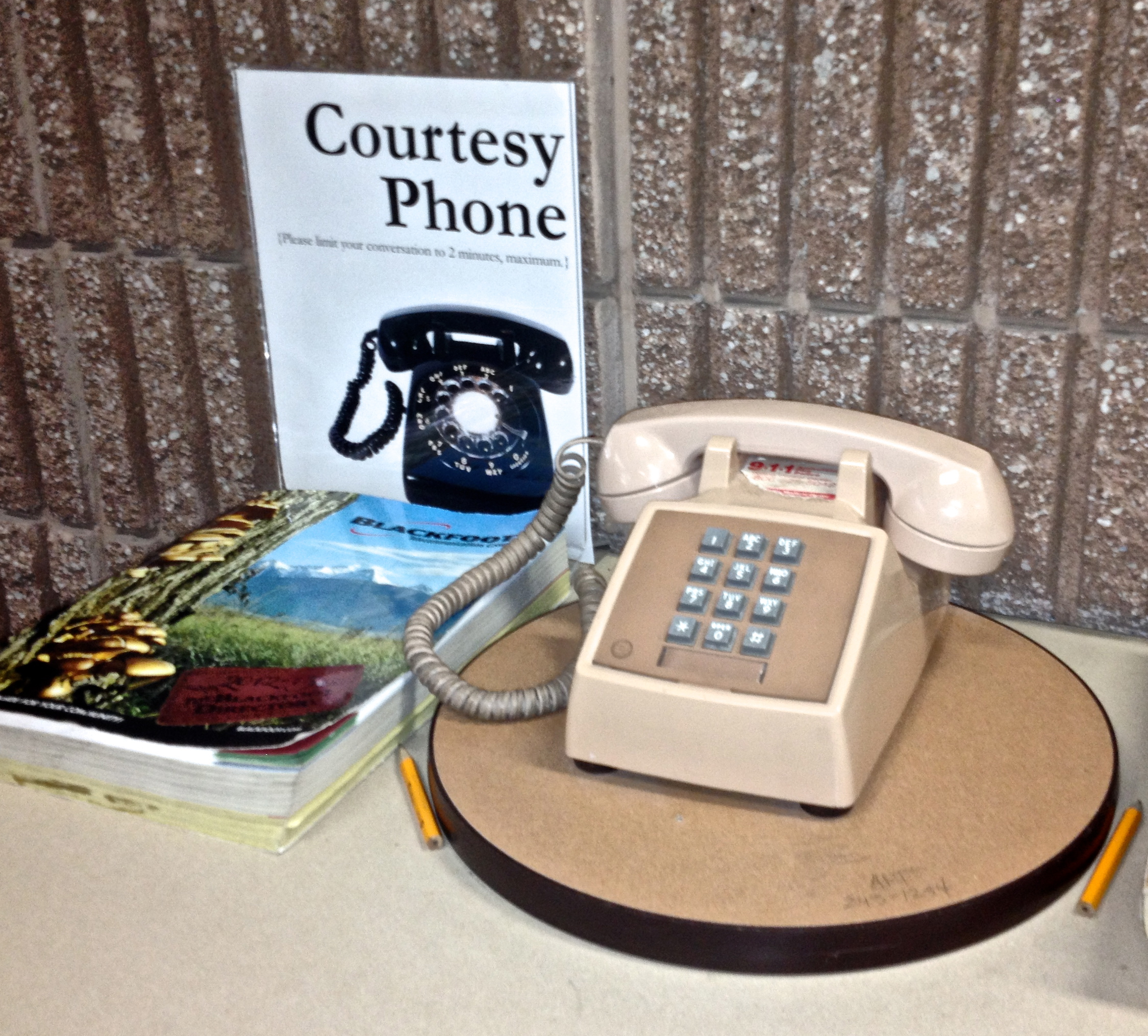
Courtesy phone, telephone book, and pencils - Missoula Public Library, Missoula, Montana.

A courtesy telephone is a telephone located in airport terminals, large train stations, hotel lobbies, and other places where many travellers are expected, which is used to relay messages to a specific person.

It is typically used in connection with a public address system announcement of the style "Gwen Cooper, please pick up the nearest white courtesy telephone." Courtesy telephones may have a distinctive color, which is traditionally white in US airports, and most have no dialing capabilities but rather are simple ringdown stations to reach an operator or other fixed number. Some double as emergency telephones, having buttons by which a user can distinguish between emergency use and inquiry.

Customers can use a courtesy phone to seek information, such as where to find further transport or a person trying to meet them. Some courtesy phones provide a direct line to a number of advertised businesses, such as motels or taxis. They may be located near baggage claim, ticketing areas, and security checkpoints.

Other telephones in public or semi-public places which may be used to make outside calls are also sometimes called "courtesy telephones".
