= Physical security =

Measures designed to deny unauthorized access

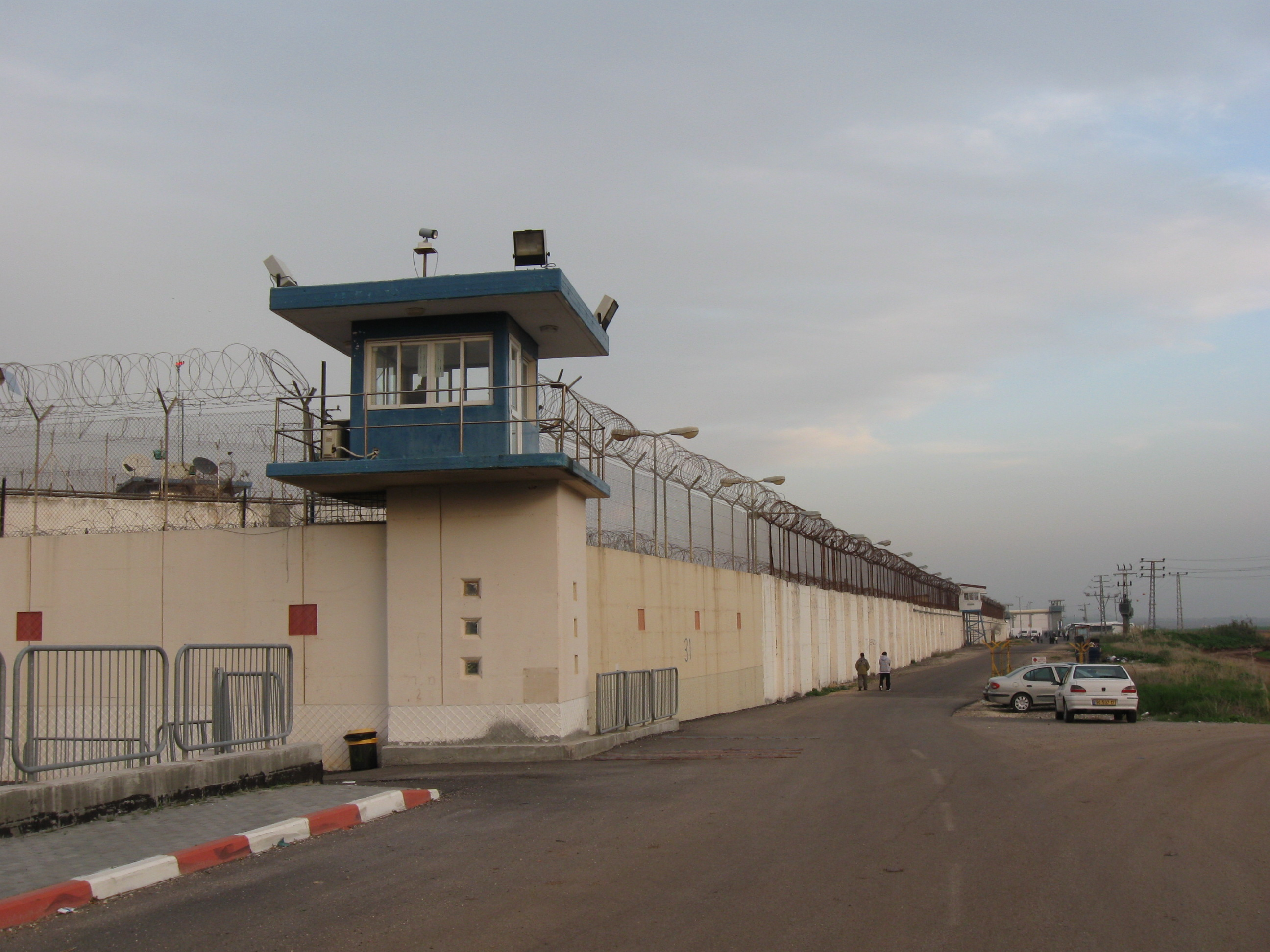
Modern prisons are among some of the most physically secure facilities, with almost every area under tight access control and surveillance. Pictured here is the exterior of Shata Prison in Israel, which is secured through the use of high fences, razor wire, protective barriers, guard towers, and security lighting.

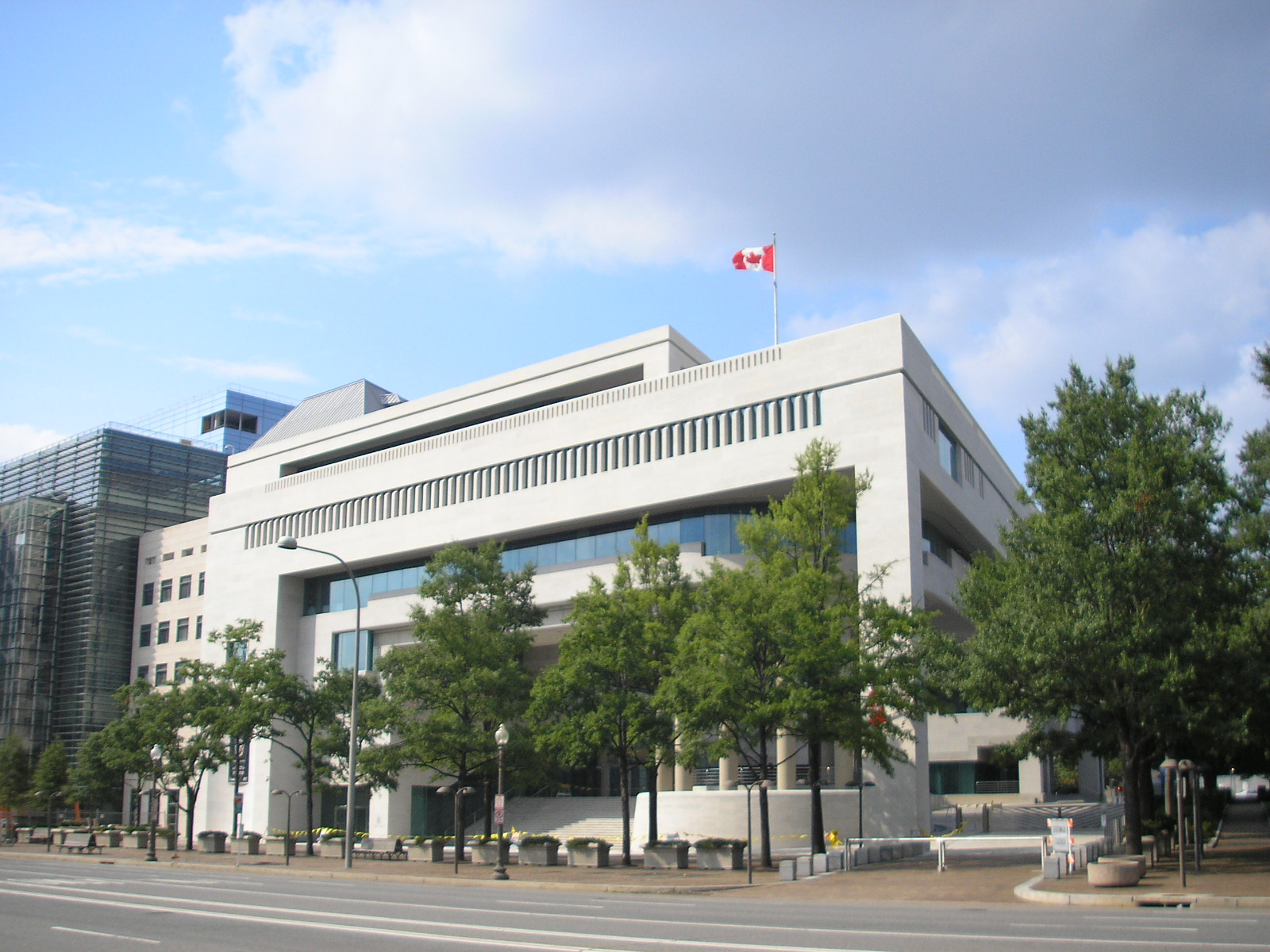
Canadian Embassy in Washington, D.C. showing planters being used as vehicle barriers to increase the standoff distance, and barriers and gates along the vehicle entrance.

Physical security describes security measures that are designed to deny unauthorized access to facilities, equipment, and resources and to protect personnel and property from damage or harm (such as espionage, theft, or terrorist attacks). Physical security involves the use of multiple layers of interdependent systems that can include CCTV surveillance, security guards, protective barriers, locks, access control, perimeter intrusion detection, deterrent systems, fire protection, and other systems designed to protect persons and property.

== Overview ==
Physical security systems for protected facilities can be intended to:

- deter potential intruders (e.g. warning signs, security lighting);
- detect intrusions, and identify, monitor and record intruders (e.g. security alarms, access control and CCTV systems);
- trigger appropriate incident responses (e.g. by security guards and police);
- delay or prevent hostile movements (e.g. door reinforcements, grilles);
- protect the assets (e.g. safes).

It is up to security designers, architects and analysts to balance security controls against risks, taking into account the costs of specifying, developing, testing, implementing, using, managing, monitoring and maintaining the controls, along with broader issues such as aesthetics, human rights, health and safety, and societal norms or conventions. Physical access security measures that are appropriate for a high security prison or a military site may be inappropriate in an office, a home or a vehicle, although the principles are similar.

== Elements and design ==
=== Deterrence ===
The goal of deterrence methods is to convince potential attackers that a successful attack is unlikely due to strong defenses.

The initial layer of security for a campus, building, office, or other physical space can use crime prevention through environmental design to deter threats. Some of the most common examples are also the most basic: warning signs or window stickers, fences, vehicle barriers, vehicle height-restrictors, restricted access points, security lighting and trenches.

=== Physical barriers ===
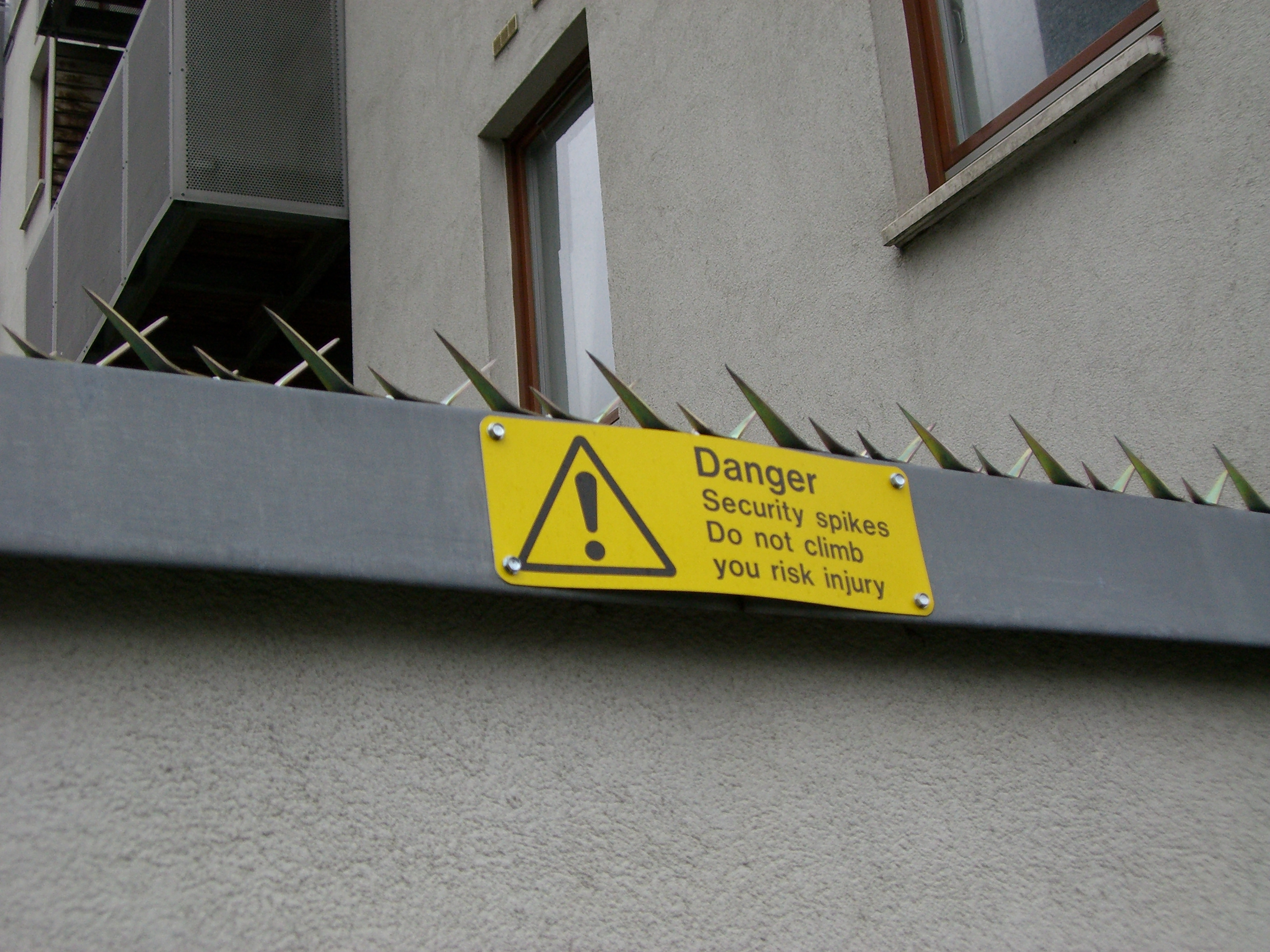
Spikes atop a barrier wall act as a deterrent to people trying to climb over the wall in Aldgate, London

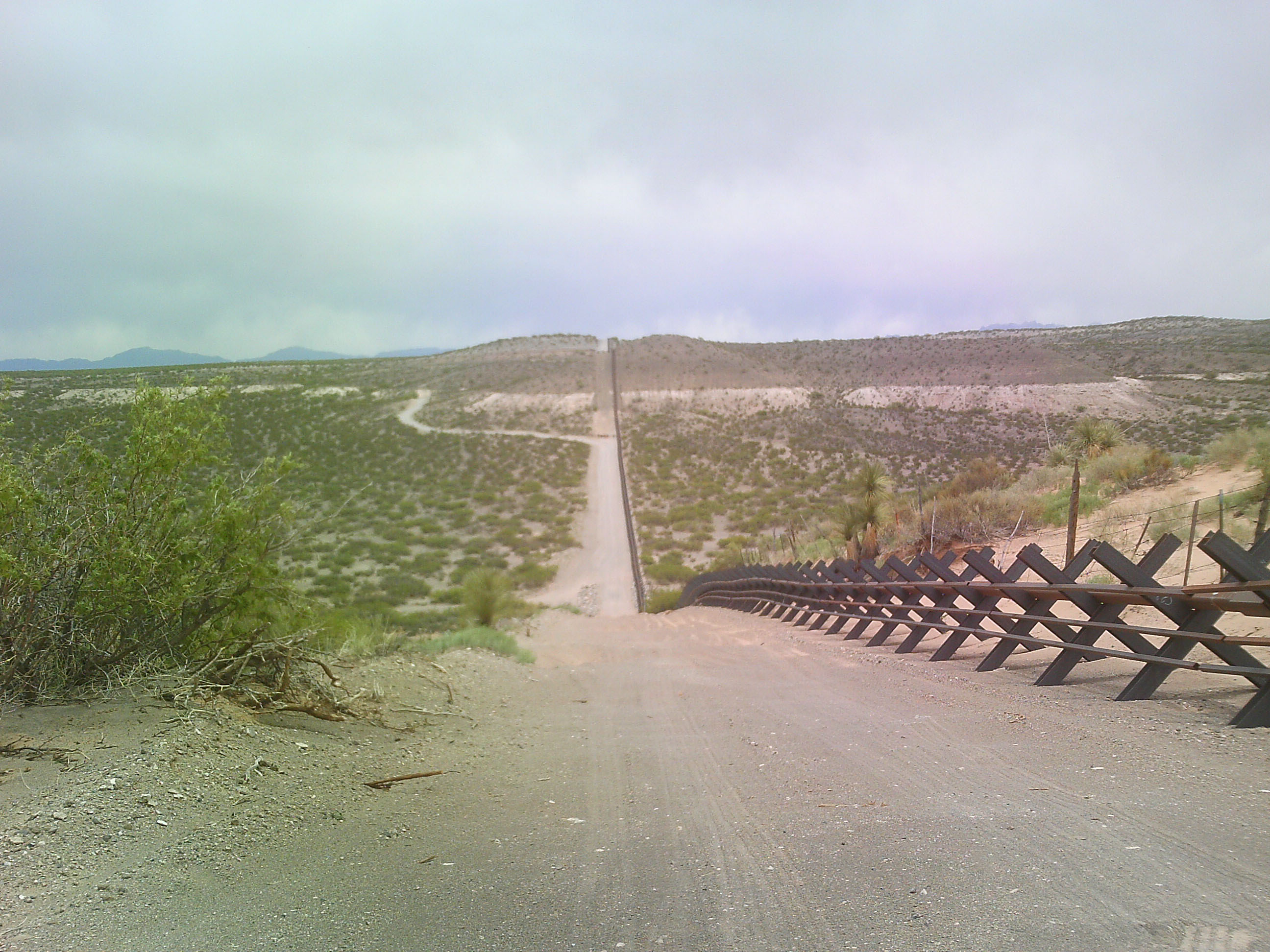
Vehicle barrier at the US Mexico border, 2010 Physical barriers such as security fences, walls, and vehicle barriers act as the outermost layer of security. They serve to prevent, or at least delay, attacks, and also act as a psychological deterrent by defining the perimeter of the facility and making intrusions seem more difficult.

For example, tall fencing, topped with barbed wire, razor wire or metal spikes are often emplaced on the perimeter of a property, generally with some type of signage that warns people not to attempt entry. However, in some facilities imposing perimeter walls or fencing will not be possible (e.g. an urban office building that is directly adjacent to public sidewalks) or it may be aesthetically unacceptable (e.g. surrounding a shopping center with tall fences topped with razor wire); in this case, the outer security perimeter will be generally defined as the walls, windows and doors of the structure itself.

=== Security lighting ===
Security lighting is another effective form of deterrence. Intruders are less likely to enter well-lit areas for fear of being seen. Doors, gates, and other entrances, in particular, should be well lit to allow close observation of people entering and exiting. When lighting the grounds of a facility, widely distributed low-intensity lighting is generally superior to small patches of high-intensity lighting, because the latter can have a tendency to create blind spots for security personnel and CCTV cameras. It is important to place lighting in a manner that makes it difficult to tamper with (e.g. suspending lights from tall poles), and to ensure that there is a backup power supply so that security lights will not go out if the electricity is cut off. The introduction of low-voltage LED-based lighting products has enabled new security capabilities, such as instant-on or strobing, while substantially reducing electrical consumption.

==== Security lighting for nuclear power plants in the United States ====
For nuclear power plants in the United States (U.S.), per the U.S. Nuclear Regulatory Commission (NRC), 10 CFR Part 73, [security] lighting is mentioned four times. The most notable mentioning contained in 10 CFR 73.55(i)(6) Illumination, which clearly identifies that licensees "-shall provide a minimum illumination level of 0.2 foot-candles, measured horizontally at ground level, in the isolation zones and appropriate exterior areas within the protected area-". ^{[Ref]} This is also the minimum illumination level specified in Table H–2 Minimum Night Firing Criteria of 10 CFR 73 Appendix H, for night firing. Per 10 CFR 73.46(b)(7) "-Tactical Response Team members, armed response personnel, and guards shall qualify and requalify, at least every 12 months, for day and night firing with assigned weapons in accordance with Appendix H-"; therefore on said respective shooting range [at night] per Appendix H, Table H-2, "-all courses [shall have] 0.2 foot-candles at center mass of target area-" applicable to handguns, shotguns, and rifles. ^{[Ref]} 1 foot-candle is approximately 10.76 lux, therefore the minimum illumination requirements for the above sections also reflect 2.152 lux.

=== Intrusion detection and electronic surveillance ===
==== Alarm systems and sensors ====
Security alarms can be installed to alert security personnel when unauthorized access is attempted. Alarm systems work in tandem with physical barriers, mechanical systems, and security guards, serving to trigger a response when these other forms of security have been breached. They consist of sensors including perimeter sensors, motion sensors, contact sensors, and glass break detectors.

However, alarms are only useful if there is a prompt response when they are triggered. In the reconnaissance phase prior to an actual attack, some intruders will test the response time of security personnel to a deliberately tripped alarm system. By measuring the length of time it takes for a security team to arrive (if they arrive at all), the attacker can determine if an attack could succeed before authorities arrive to neutralize the threat. Loud audible alarms can also act as a psychological deterrent, by notifying intruders that their presence has been detected.

In some U.S. jurisdictions, law enforcement will not respond to alarms from intrusion detection systems unless the activation has been verified by an eyewitness or video. Policies like this one have been created to combat the 94–99 percent rate of false alarm activation in the United States.

==== Video surveillance ====
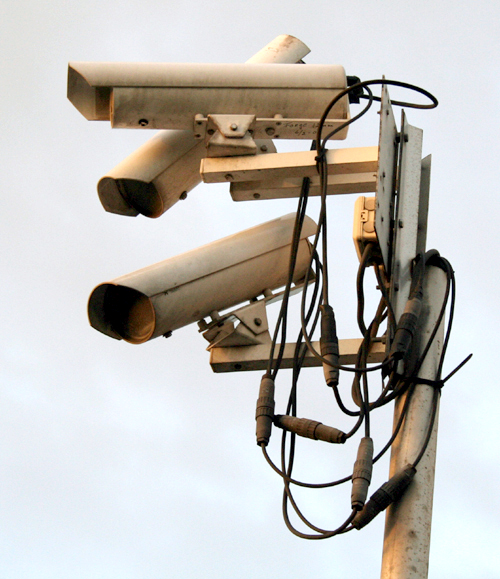
Closed-circuit television cameras

Surveillance cameras can be a deterrent when placed in highly visible locations and are useful for incident assessment and historical analysis. For example, if alarms are being generated and there is a camera in place, security personnel assess the situation via the camera feed. In instances when an attack has already occurred and a camera is in place at the point of attack, the recorded video can be reviewed. Although the term closed-circuit television (CCTV) is common, it is quickly becoming outdated as more video systems lose the closed circuit for signal transmission and are instead transmitting on IP camera networks.

Video monitoring does not necessarily guarantee a human response. A human must be monitoring the situation in real time in order to respond in a timely manner; otherwise, video monitoring is simply a means to gather evidence for later analysis. However, technological advances like video analytics are reducing the amount of work required for video monitoring as security personnel can be automatically notified of potential security events.

=== Access control ===
Access control methods are used to monitor and control traffic through specific access points and areas of the secure facility. This is done using a variety of methods, including CCTV surveillance, identification cards, security guards, biometric readers, locks, doors, turnstiles and gates.

==== Mechanical access control systems ====
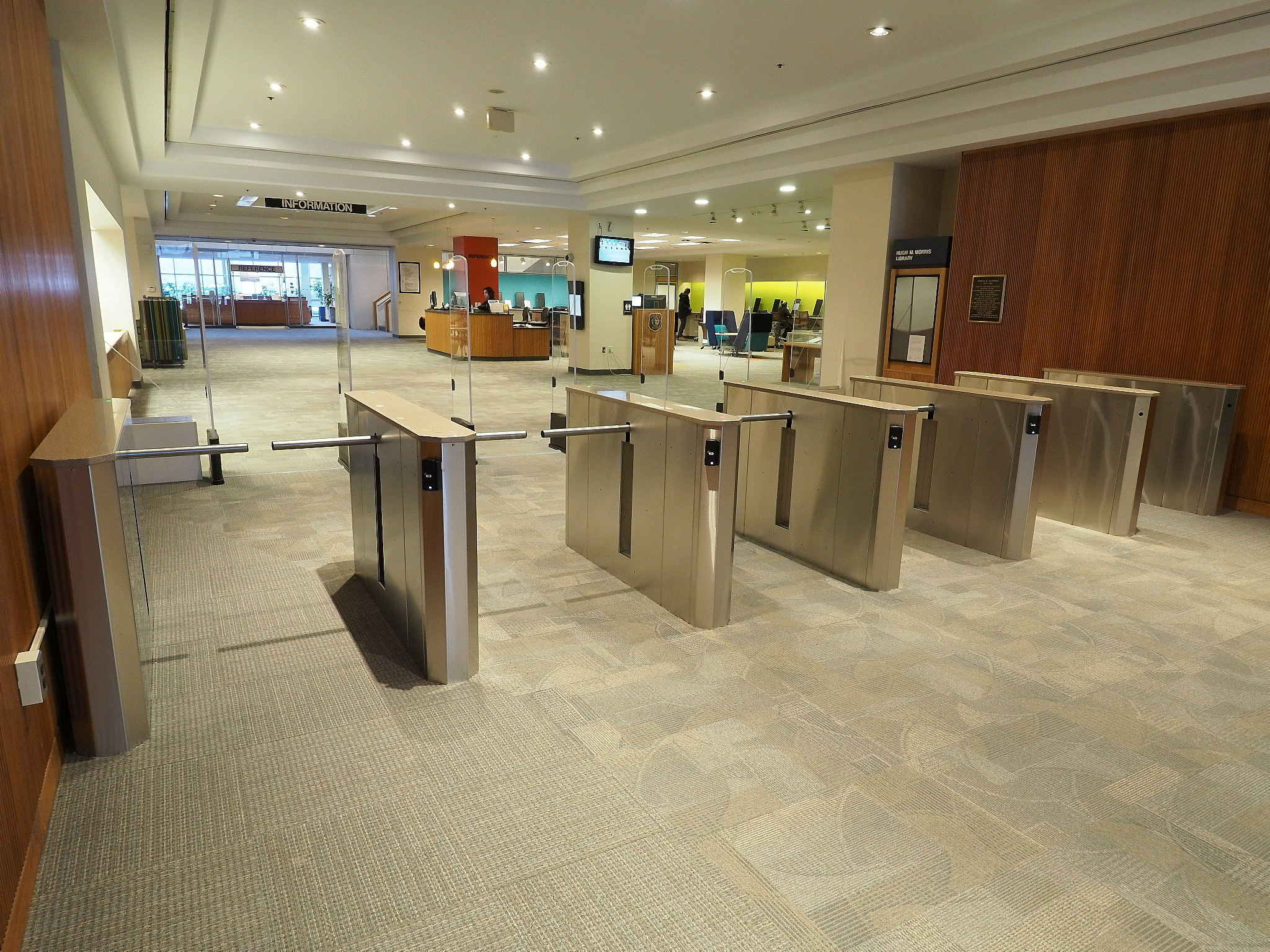
A drop arm optical turnstile

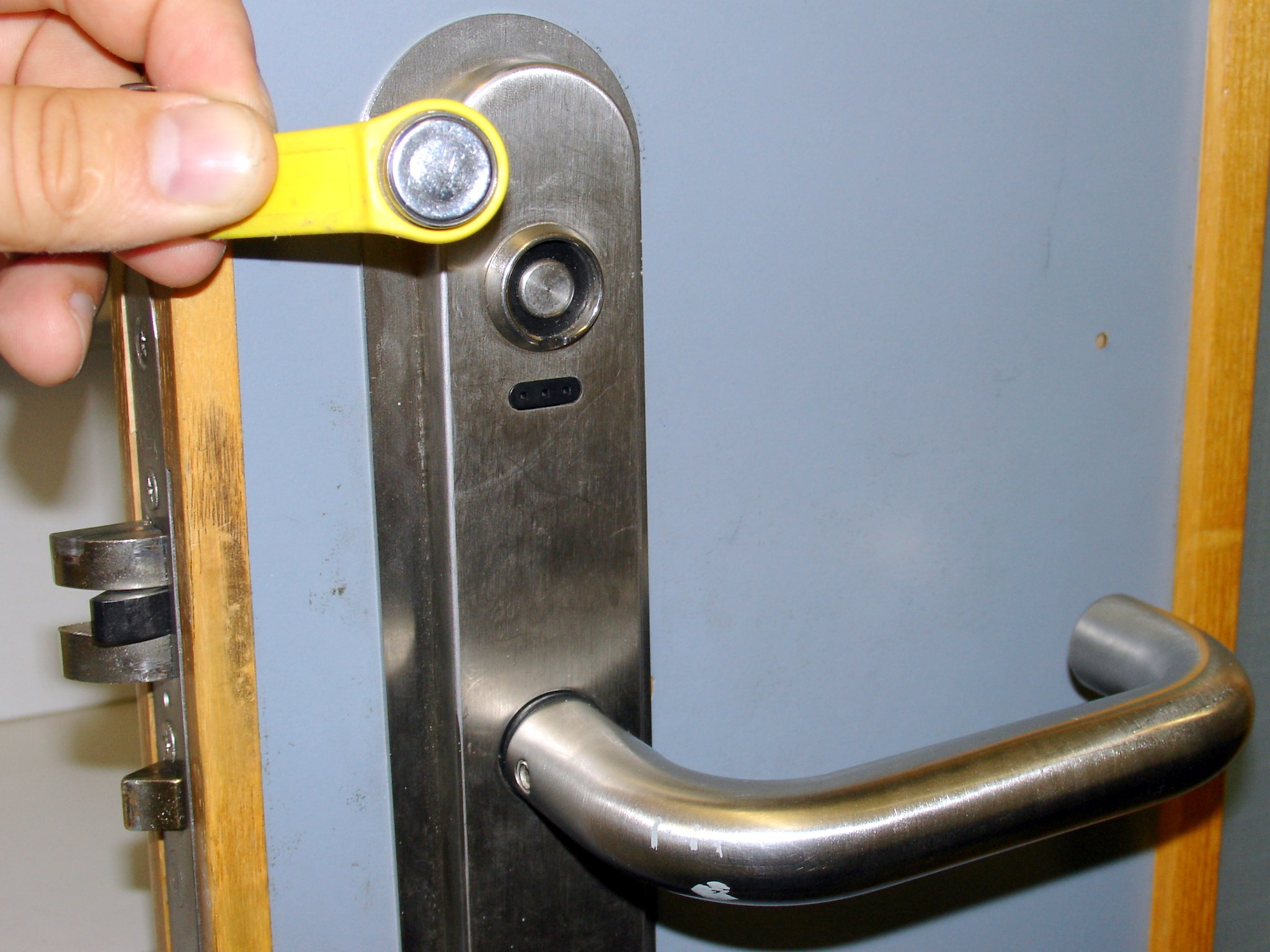
An electronic access control system, controlling entry through a door

Mechanical access control systems include turnstiles, gates, doors, and locks. Key control of the locks becomes a problem with large user populations and any user turnover. Keys quickly become unmanageable, often forcing the adoption of electronic access control.

==== Electronic access control systems ====
Electronic access control systems provide secure access to buildings or facilities by controlling who can enter and exit. Some aspects of these systems can include:

- Access credentials - Access cards, fobs, or badges are used to identify and authenticate authorized users. Information encoded on the credentials is read by card readers at entry points.
- Access control panels - These control the system, make access decisions, and are usually located in a secure area. Access control software runs on the panels and interfaces with card reader.
- Readers - Installed at access points, these read credentials or other data, and send information to the access control panel. Readers can be proximity, magnetic stripe, smart card, biometrics, etc.
- Door locking hardware - Electrified locks, electric strikes, or maglocks physically secure doors and release when valid credentials are presented. Integration allows doors to unlock when authorized.
- Request to exit devices - These allow free egress through an access point without triggering an alarm. Buttons, motion detectors, and other sensors are commonly used.
- Alarms - Unauthorized access attempts or held/forced doors can trigger audible alarms and alerts. Integration with camera systems also occurs.
- Access levels - Software can limit access to specific users, groups, and times. For example, some employees may have 24/7 access to all areas while others are restricted.
- Event logging - Systems record activity like access attempts, alarms, user tracking, etc. for security auditing and troubleshooting purposes.

Electronic access control uses credential readers, advanced software, and electrified locks to provide programmable, secure access management for facilities. Integration of cameras, alarms and other systems is also common.

An additional sub-layer of mechanical/electronic access control protection is reached by integrating a key management system to manage the possession and usage of mechanical keys to locks or property within a building or campus.

==== Identification systems and access policies ====
Another form of access control (procedural) includes the use of policies, processes and procedures to manage the ingress into the restricted area. An example of this is the deployment of security personnel conducting checks for authorized entry at predetermined points of entry. This form of access control is usually supplemented by the earlier forms of access control (i.e. mechanical and electronic access control), or simple devices such as physical passes.

=== Security personnel ===
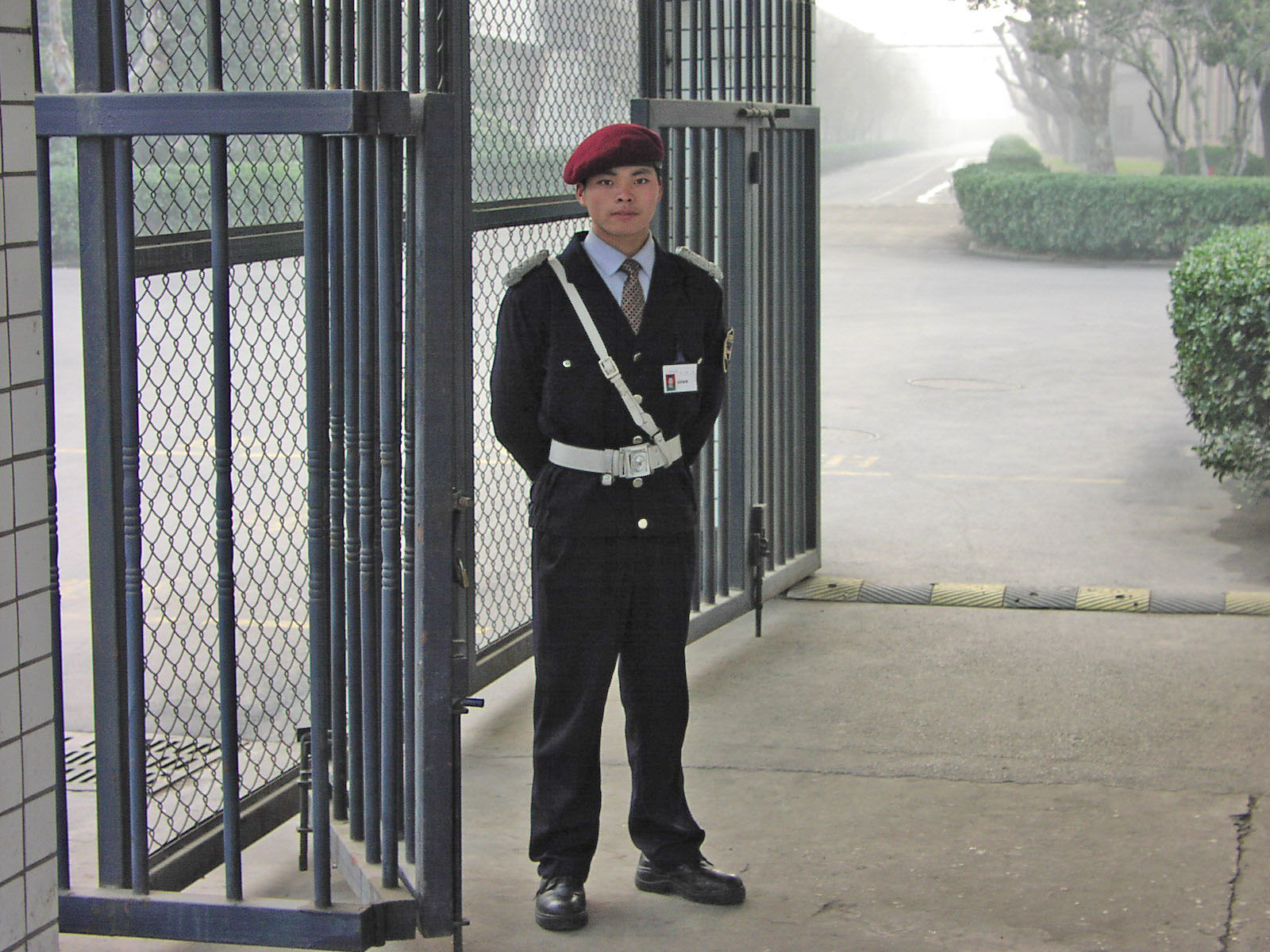
Private guard of a Chinese factory

Security personnel play a central role in all layers of security. All of the technological systems that are employed to enhance physical security are useless without a security force that is trained in their use and maintenance, and which knows how to properly respond to breaches in security. Security personnel perform many functions: patrolling facilities, administering electronic access control, responding to alarms, and monitoring and analyzing video footage.

== See also ==
- Alarm management
- Artificial intelligence for video surveillance
- Biometric device
- Biometrics
- Computer security
- Door security
- Executive protection
- Guard tour patrol system
- Information security
- Infrastructure security
- Logical security
- Nuclear security
- Perimeter intrusion detection system
- Physical Security Professional
- Security alarm
- Security company
- Security convergence
- Security engineering
- Surveillance
- High-voltage transformer fire barriers
