= Prison escape =

Unlawful evacuation from prisons

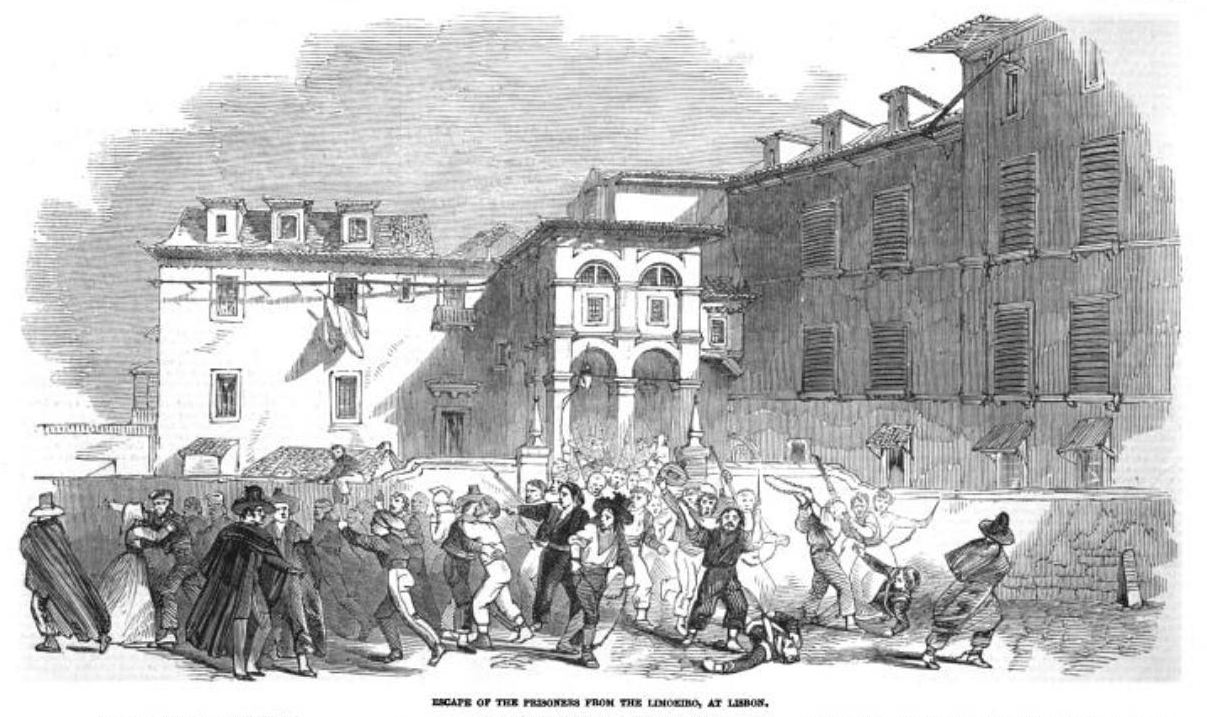
Escape of the prisoners from the Limoeiro, at Lisbon, 29 April 1847, during the Patuleia civil war

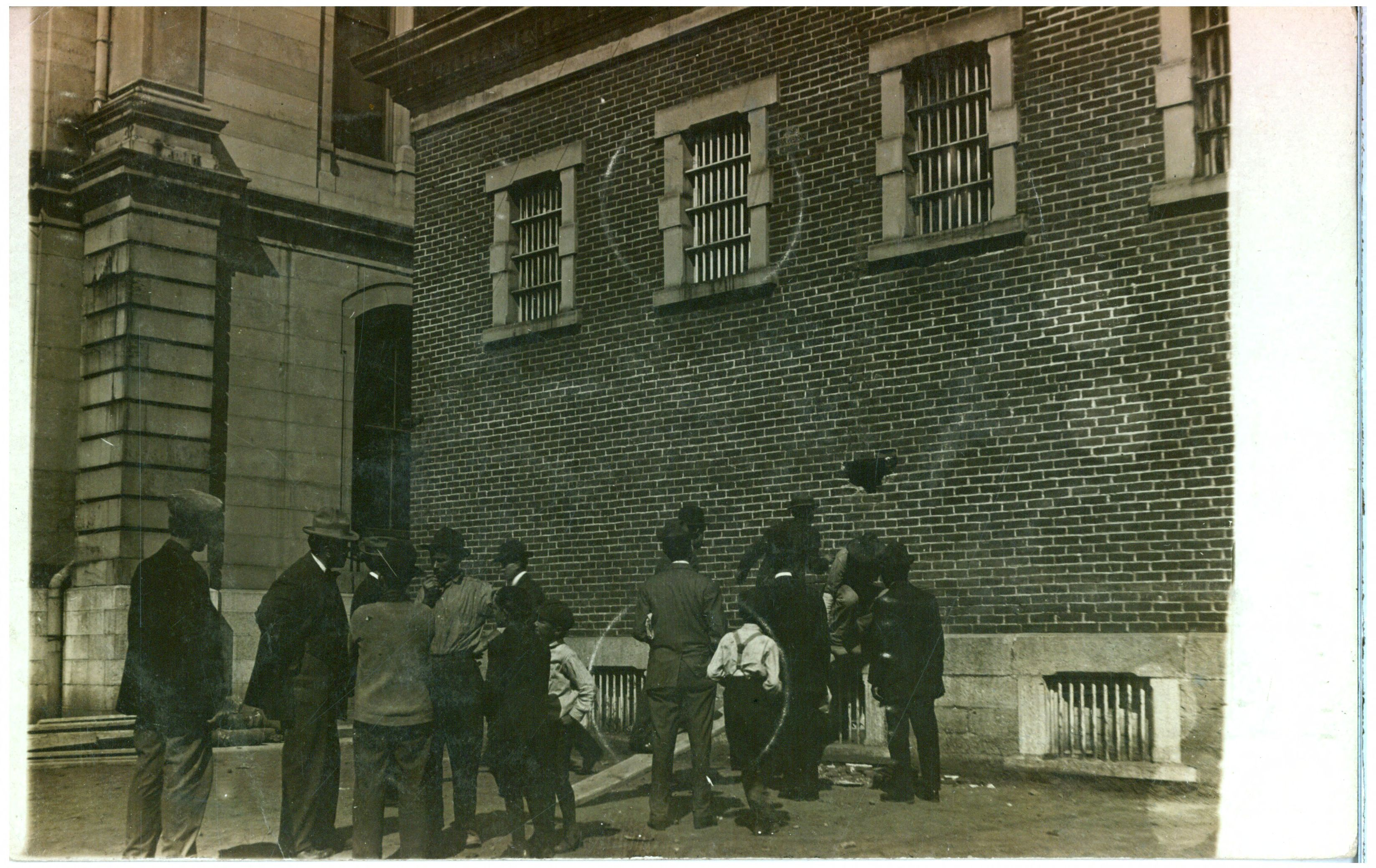
Escape from prison in Greenville, Ohio, USA (1909)

A prison escape (also referred to as a bust out, breakout, jailbreak, jail escape, prison break or unlawful departure) is the act of an inmate leaving prison through unofficial or illegal ways. Normally, when this occurs, an effort is made on the part of authorities to recapture them and return them to their original detainers. Escaping from prison is also a criminal offense in some countries, such as the United States and Canada, and usually results in time being added to the inmate's sentence, as well as the inmate being placed under increased security that is usually a maximum security prison or supermax prison. In Germany and a number of other countries, it is considered human nature to want to escape from a prison and it is considered as a violation of the right of freedom, so escape is not penalized in itself (in the absence of other factors such as threats of violence, actual violence, or property damage).

Many prisons use security features such as CCTV, perimeter sensors, barred windows, high walls, barbed wire, razor wire, and electric fencing to prevent escapes. Even natural geographic features can play significant roles in preventing escapes; historically, mountains and islands were chosen as ideal settings for prison construction, given their significance in creating territorial isolation from outside worlds.

== Methods ==
Numerous methods have been used to escape from prisons over time. Many escapes have been successfully conducted by inmates who have invented their own methods. Weaknesses that are found as prisoners escape are often corrected at numerous prisons around the world to prevent future escapes in a similar manner. This leads inmates to find new escape methods.

The following are methods that have commonly been used by prisoners in escapes. In some instances, a combination of these are used.

=== Cell escape ===
While some prisoners are allowed out of their cells at times, others remain locked in their cells most of the time, particularly those in solitary confinement. Many prisoners who are kept in their cells must find ways out of the cells. Even those who are allowed out of their cells at times still have plans that involve escape from their cells.

Cell escapes occur through either the door, the window, the light, the ventilation system, by breaking down the walls, or by tunneling underground.

Some prisoners have escaped by picking the locks on their cells.

=== Containment penetration ===
Containment penetration involves breaking down or slipping through the physical containment of the prison, including that of the cell itself or the surrounding complex. Methods include the destruction of the cell or compound walls, squeezing through tight spaces, or entering off-limits areas. Prisoners often destroy their containment with homemade tools, smuggled objects, or other contraband.

Most prisons are contained on the outside by one or more fences, often topped with barbed wire or razor wire. Escapees manage to scale these fences successfully or cut holes in the fences, damaging them. These fences are also watched by one or more guards from a tower, but escapees manage to pass the fence when the guard is turned away, unable to see in the dark, or sleeping on the job. Outside the fences is often a perimeter patrol conducted by an officer in a vehicle, which stands as the final line of defense. Escapees manage to evade this by studying the length of time between passes, waiting until it is on the other side, or using the cover of darkness.

An uncommon method that has been used at times involves the digging of a tunnel under the facility that exits outside the facility.

=== Physical force ===
Physical force involves attacking guards with blunt force, homemade weapons, smuggled weapons, or weapons stolen from overpowered guards.

Some escapes involve one or more prisoner taking over an entire unit or section of the prison, subduing guards, and stealing weapons or other objects they can use to their advantage.

=== Deception ===
Deception may involve fooling one or more guards into believing the prisoner is authorized to depart prison grounds for a legitimate reason, or the prisoner disguising himself or herself as a worker or civilian who can exit prison grounds without arousing suspicion, or the creation of a ruse to mislead guards.

In some escapes, inmates construct makeshift dummies to give the appearance that they are in their cells asleep in bed. This enables the inmate to gain a head start before guards discover they are actually missing. Such dummies are crudely constructed often using papier-mâché, human hair, clothing, shoes, and other miscellaneous materials to serve as stuffing to create the appearance a body is present.

=== Exploitation of weaknesses ===
Finding holes in the security of the facility, and taking advantage of them. This may include the discovery of overlooked security issues, or taking advantage of guards who are not following policies or procedures, or are otherwise not doing their jobs properly.

=== Exploitation of corruption ===
Taking advantage of intentional wrongdoing on part of prison staff. This may include the use of weapons or other contraband smuggled in by staff, or receiving assistance from staff who assist due to their personal initiative or by other means of compensation.

=== Failure to return ===
Some lower security inmates are permitted to leave prison grounds temporarily on the honor they will return. These include those who depart for employment outside the facility or furloughs that allow time outside for periods of time.

=== Escape from outside ===
Breaking while in custody outside facility grounds. Prisoners are often transported for work duties, to be moved between facilities, attend court hearings, for hospitalization and medical appointments, and other reasons.

=== Outside help ===
Receiving aid from an accomplice outside prison walls, including those who provide a ride to the inmate following their penetration, smuggle in contraband as visitors, or use helicopters, among other methods.

When a banned item is smuggled, it can either be slipped through or tossed over the fence from outside, hidden in a gift to the inmate that is legal, or slipped past corrupt security officers. In some cases, the staff are the source of the smuggling themselves.

=== Escape from island prisons ===
Escaping from an island prison brings another challenge of crossing the water to free land. This can be done by construction of a makeshift raft or receiving outside help from the owner of a boat. In the famed 1962 Alcatraz escape, a makeshift raft from raincoats was confirmed. One additional theory is that a boat was used to transport them in the water.

== Prevention ==
Prevention of prison escape includes the numerous security measures that are in effect. How many and which measures are used depends on the security level and specific institution. Some of the preventive measures are:

=== Structural ===
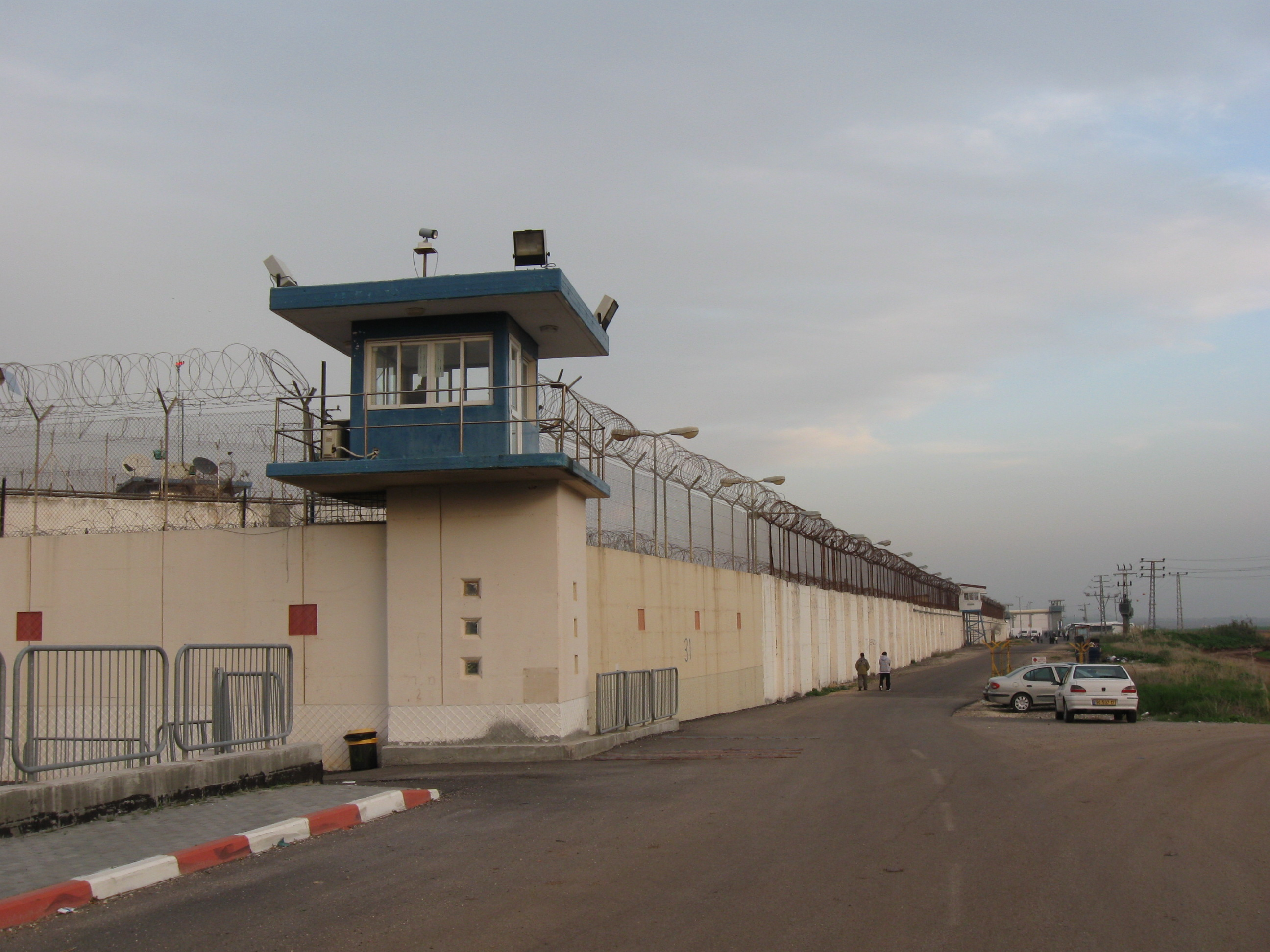
Prisons often have structural features such as barbed or razor wire, motion sensors, high walls and guard towers to prevent escape.

- One or more fences surrounding the facility
- Barbed wire or razor wire on topping fences that surround the facility
- Razor wire on the ground between fences, thereby making one's presence in this area dangerous and possibly deadly
- Multiple locked doors between the "pods" (sections of cells) and the exit
- Cell windows made too narrow for a human body to fit through; iron bars are often fitted

=== Guard placement ===
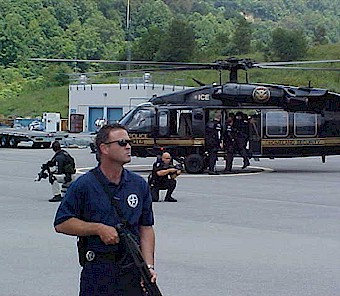
United States Marshals observing prisoner transport to prevent escape

- Rounds: Guards within the facility make rounds checking inmates at set intervals
- Full-time watch: High-risk inmates are watched non-stop around the clock one-on-one
- Guard towers: Guards in towers at corners of compound can observe edges of the facility and are often authorized to use deadly force against fleeing escapees
- Perimeter patrol: A guard in a vehicle circles the compound from the outside, watching for escaping inmates

=== Technology ===
- Surveillance cameras allow guards to monitor areas of the compound without being physically present
- Security lighting provides nighttime visibility of exterior areas, including entrances, exercise yards and perimeter fencing
- Microwave or buried RF sensors alert security if an inmate nears the fence or has entered a sterile area (protected area, such as the space between a pair of parallel fences, in which inmates are not allowed).
- Thermal cameras detect heat signatures and can notify guards if an inmate (or other unauthorized person) is present in a restricted area or moving towards the fence
- Video analytics that detect, track and classify people, objects, and vehicles near the perimeter
- Alarms, buzzers, or sirens make guards aware if any doors or gates are open, signifying a possible breach
- Perimeter intrusion detection systems sound an alarm if fences are climbed or cut. Some systems also provide guards with live audio feedback

=== Routine ===
- Head counts at set times to ensure the number of inmates in the facility matches the number on record
- Cell searches to make sure inmates do not have contraband that can be used to aid an escape or commit violence against guards or other inmates

== Punishment ==
In some jurisdictions, including the United States, escaping from jail or prison is a criminal offense. In Virginia, for instance, the punishment for escape depends on whether the offender used force, violence, or set fire to the jail, as well as the seriousness of the offense for which they were imprisoned.

In Russia, escaping from prison is an offence that can result in up to four years being added to the inmate's sentence.

In the United Kingdom, escaping from lawful custody is a common law offence; if any force is used, the common law offence is termed "breaking prison."

In some countries (including Belgium, Germany, the Netherlands, Sweden, Austria, Switzerland, Iceland, Mexico, Chile, and Brazil), the philosophy of the law holds that it is human nature to want to escape. In those countries, escapees who do not break any other laws are not charged, and no extra time is added to their sentence. However, anyone who is returned to prison after a prison break will face stricter prison conditions, and may lose privileges such as the possibility of an early release.

== See also ==
- Escape tunnel
- Fugitive
- Manhunt (law enforcement)
- Prison film
- Prison literature
- Prison riot

== Footnotes ==
- McMillan, David (2007). Escape. Singapore: Monsoon Books. ISBN 978-981-05-7568-7.
