= Security perimeter =

Security perimeter may refer to:

- Access control
- Perimeter fence
- Police perimeter
- Perimeter security
