= Window security =

Physical security

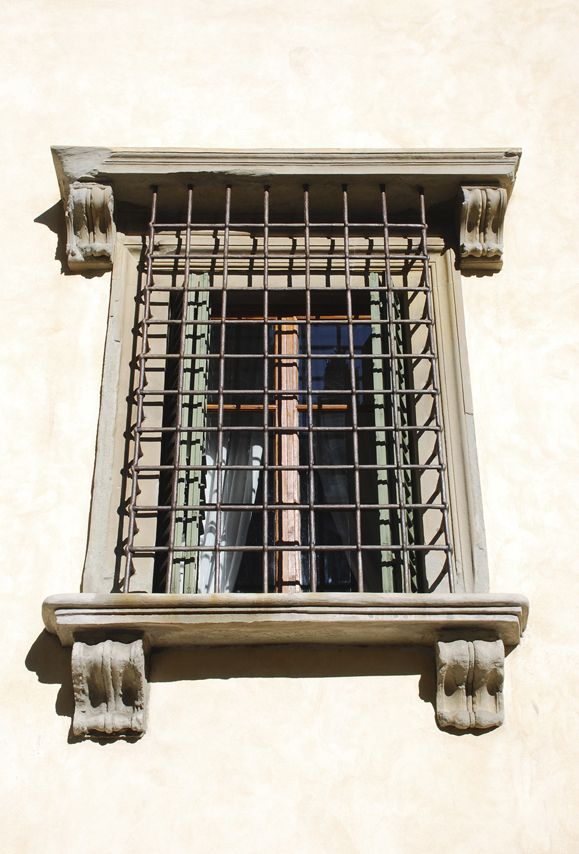
Barred window of Villa Capponi, in Florence

The term window security may refer to any of a range of measures used to avoid unauthorized access through windows, and prevent crimes such as burglary and home invasions. Window security is used in commercial and government buildings, as well as in residential settings.

== History ==
In ancient Greek and Roman houses, grilles were rarely used and had simple designs, rectangular or diamond-shaped, as shown in 1st and 2nd-century wall paintings. In medieval times some castles, prisons and convents were protected by rudimentary iron grilles. From the 11th century to 15th, in France, Spain, Germany and Italy, the blacksmiths started to take care of the beauty of their products, so the grilles started to be characterized by iron and bronze decorative motifs. While French blacksmiths approached the highest perfection in the execution of Gothic and Baroque grilles, Italian ones maintained the sobriety of design. After attempts to imitate stylistically these grilles in the 19th century, the simplicity of design has taken over, and particular importance is given to the materials and the execution. Openable bars have been introduced to the market.

During the middle of the 1800s in the United Kingdom, glass started to be used in the ordinary shops, but wooden shutters were retained to protect the goods exposed. At about this time, metal grilles started to be used at night to allow passersby to view the goods on display. Metal roller shutters were introduced in the late 1970s and early 1980s as a response to street riots throughout the United Kingdom, but now there are alternative solutions for the security of shops.

== Security devices ==
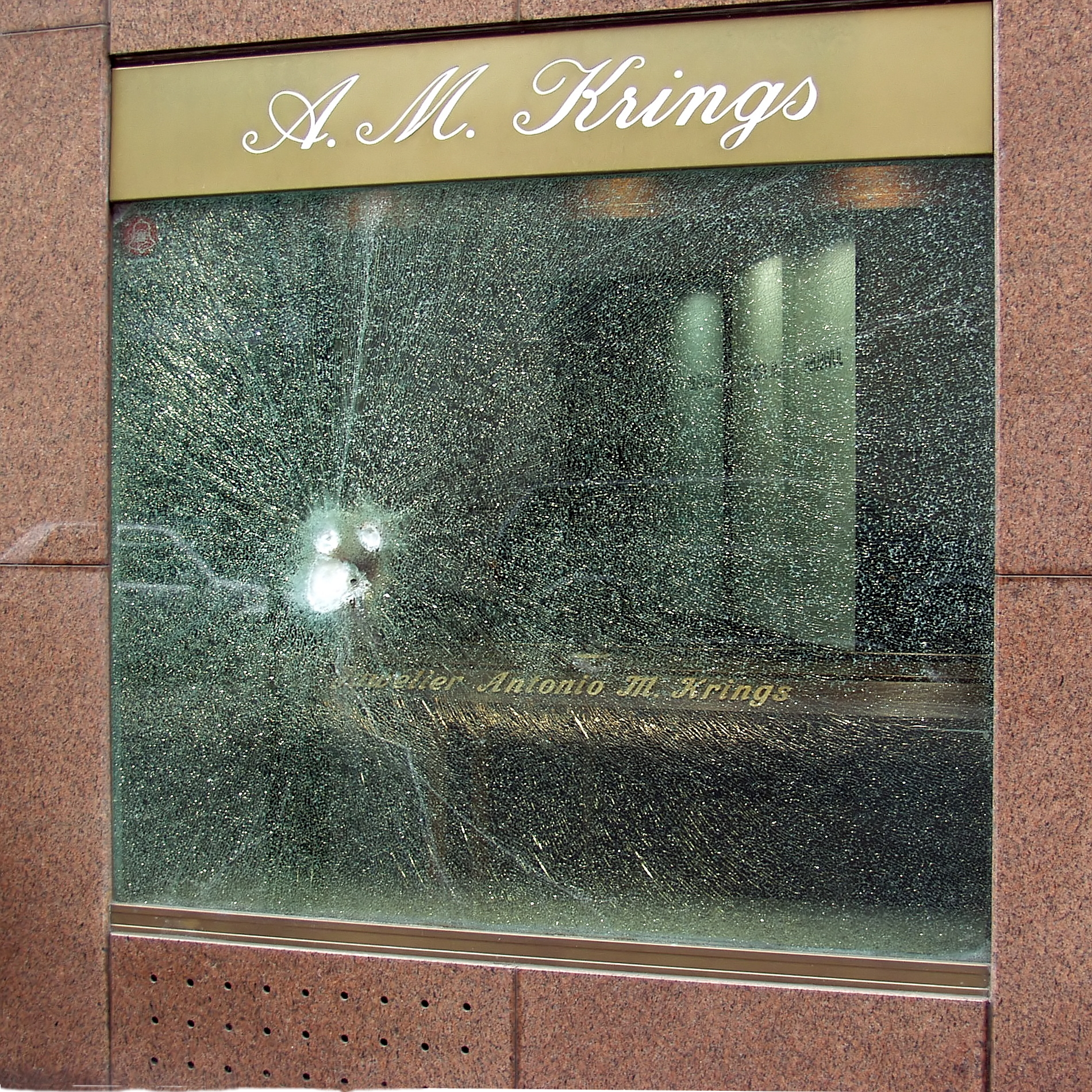
Bulletproof glass window after a burglary attempt

=== Physical barriers ===
Possible physical barriers are:

- Window with security features, such as:
  - Security glass
  - Window lock
- Grille
- Window shutter (roller shutter, louver, etc.)

==== European certifications ====
According to the European standards (EN 1627, EN 1628, EN 1629 and EN 1630), the resistance of a closing system can be classified into six levels, for which it has to be tested in standardized modalities.

Class	Tools and perpetrator profile	Time
1	Occasional burglar with physical violence	N/A
2	Occasional burglar with simple tools such as screwdrivers, pliers, wedges	3 minutes
3	Occasional or experienced burglar with additional lever tool, such as crowbars	5 minutes
4	Experienced burglar with cutting and hammering tool	10 minutes
5	Experienced burglar with electrical equipment	15 minutes
6	Experienced burglar with large-size electrical equipment	20 minutes

=== Intrusion detection and surveillance ===
- Wired or Wireless security alarm can be designed to warn intrusions through windows, using sensors like glass break detectors and contact magnetic sensors
- Security lighting (including those systems with automatic light switch and timers) is useful to make evident an attempt of unauthorized access
- Video surveillance is today able to send alarm signals from the system on electronic devices

== Disadvantages ==
Window locks may be difficult to use for elderly or disabled people, but easier to use locks have become available. In addition, during a fire or a similar emergency situation in which it is necessary to escape, lockable windows, window shutters or grilles (especially fixed ones) may become dangerous obstacles, so it is necessary to ensure that the keys are as close to the windows as is practical or, if a window is an important emergency exit, that it can be opened from the inside without the use of a key.

== See also ==
- Door security
