= State Nuclear Power Safety Inspectorate of Lithuania =

State Nuclear Power Safety Inspectorate (VATESI) is the state regulator for nuclear energy in the Republic of Lithuania. It is also responsible for safety in use of ionising radiation in this area.

== Heads ==
- Genadijus Lipunovas – 1991–1992
- Povilas Vaišnys – 1992–1997 m
- Saulius Kutas – 1997–2006
- Kazys Žilys – 2006
- Gytis Maksimovas – 2006–2009
- In 2012 Michail Demčenko was appointed to the position of VATESI Head.

== See also ==
- Nuclear power
- Nuclear safety and security
- Radiation safety
- Physical security
