= Physical Security Professional =

Certification in physical security

A Physical Security Professional (PSP) is a Board certification process for individuals involved in the physical security of organizations. This certification process is offered by ASIS International. Certification lasts for three years, during which time ASIS requires credential holders to complete 60 Continuing Professional Education credits in order to meet recertification standards.

== Skill requirements ==
Technical experience and skills involved in this certification include:

- Design of security procedures and systems
- Setup, operation, and maintenance of security systems
- Responsibilities of people associated with security and response procedures
- Performing threat surveys to evaluate the dangers present at a location or in an organization

== Purpose of certification ==
The intent of this certification is to provide employers a means of knowing that an individual has a high level of knowledge pertaining to physical security. ASIS set the bar high, starting with specific eligibility requirements and continuing with recertification standards. They test applicants for knowledge and expertise in a number of areas such as threat assessment and risk analysis, an understanding of integrated physical security systems, and the ability to implement, evaluate and identify security measures and/or needs for a wide variety of protection situations. All of this is to maintain an accurate reflection of current industry skill and knowledge needs as well as to keep abreast of new technology and best practices.

== See also ==
- Security
- Guard tour patrol system
