= Perimeter security =

Fortifications to keep intruders out

Perimeter security refers to natural barriers or constructed fortifications designed either to prevent intruders from entering an area or to contain individuals within an enclosed area.

== Purpose ==
Since at least the Roman Empire, fortifications, walls and barriers have been an important part of protecting sovereign territories and private property. Perimeter security is designed with the primary purpose to either keep intruders out or captives contained within the area the boundary surrounds. Both natural and manmade barriers can serve as perimeter security.

Governments use perimeter security not only for the safety of their citizens, but to control the flow of commerce and immigration, as well as to protect vital infrastructure from attackers. Property owners and organizations of all sizes use various man-made technology to achieve varying degrees of perimeter security.

== History ==
One of the earliest known instances of perimeter security on a large scale is Hadrian's Wall in the Roman Empire. Around 122 AD, the wall was built along the northern border of the empire out of turf, and later stone. Theories regarding the wall's purpose vary, but most scholars agree it was probably built at least in part for the defense of the empire.

Perhaps the most famous illustration of perimeter security in ancient times was the Great Wall of China. It was originally built to withstand nomadic invaders from the North. The wall was successful to some degree, although it has been suggested that it served as more of a psychological barrier than a physical barrier.

In warfare, securing the perimeter has proven vital to military forces. From sharpened pikes in medieval times to more modern technological solutions, armed forces have always sought to prevent their enemies from breaching their front lines. In the American Civil War and both World Wars, as well as the Korean and Vietnam Wars, landmines were used extensively to create tactical barriers between enemy lines. These tactics are sometimes controversial because of the loss of civilian life.

In World War II, the German military developed concrete barriers called dragon's teeth to slow the approach of enemy tanks. This tactic was adopted by allied forces, and lines of reinforced concrete pyramids can still be seen throughout Europe today.

One example of perimeter protection still in use is razor wire fencing. While U.S. ranchers in the 19th century kept cattle in and rustlers out with barbed wire, World War I saw the advent of specialized barbed wire to secure military operations. The 1965 escalation of the Vietnam War was accelerated by the successful penetration of ten-foot-high concertina wire fencing around Camp Holloway. Variations of this type of perimeter protection were used throughout the 20th century. Booby traps, electric fencing, watchtowers and night flares were also employed to keep enemy forces out.

== Natural barriers ==
The mountains, rivers, oceans, deserts, canyons, and glaciers of the world have long provided a natural barrier to invasion and trade among competing groups. A prime example is India's isolation from the rest of Asia due to the Himalayas. The English Channel proved invaluable in World War II as a deterrent to Nazi aggression. England's relative isolation allowed allied forces to use it as a staging area for the D-Day invasion, which turned the tide of the war. The Rocky Mountains in North America proved a formidable perimeter protection of isolated native cultures for centuries. Likewise, exploitation of Alaska's rich resources was greatly delayed while innovation lagged in breaking through the icy and oceanic perimeter.

Technology has largely overcome most of the world's natural barriers. Only deep in the Amazon rainforest remain tribes that are somewhat protected from global society due to the natural barrier of naturally harsh conditions and the vast tributary system of the Amazon River.

A similar argument can be made regarding the world's deserts. Even with advanced technology, the lack of water and harsh temperatures make traversing and living in the world's deserts a journey for a relative few. The Sahara is a prime example.

== Fences ==
Invented in the mid-1800s, chain-link fencing did not achieve major adoption until industrialized manufacturing began in the United States in 1898. Still in heavy use today, this relatively cost effective perimeter is popular due to its transparency, strength, storage, and ease of installation. From airports to school playgrounds, chain link fencing demand remains strong as a long-term perimeter solution. Fences alone can be easily circumvented via climbing, cutting, or digging, which has led to well known instances of perimeter breaches, such as at airports and a man scaling the fence at the US White House.

Fixed perimeter defences such as walls and permanent fencing are less practical at temporary and forward operating bases, which are established, relocated and dismantled on short timescales. Rapidly deployable barrier systems were widely used for this purpose during the Iraq War and the war in Afghanistan.

=== MEMS ===
MEMS technology can be used to enhance the effectiveness of fences' protection by incorporating sensors that can detect changes in pressure, vibration, and other physical phenomena. Standing for "microelectromechanical systems", they are tiny devices that combine mechanical and electrical components on a small scale. They can be used to create sensors that are small, lightweight, and highly sensitive to various physical inputs.

In the context of a perimeter fence, MEMS sensors can be attached to the fenced area. These sensors could detect changes in pressure or vibration caused by someone attempting to climb over or cut through the fence. The sensors then transmit an alert to a security system, allowing security personnel to respond quickly to the attempted breach.

Overall, incorporating MEMS technology into a perimeter fence could provide significant benefits in terms of security, durability, and maintenance. As technology continues to advance, more innovative ways of using MEMS to enhance the security of our physical surroundings could be seen.

== Electronic technology ==
With the advent of electronic sensors, the concept of perimeter security evolved rapidly to include more modern, technological solutions. These can allow both private entities and governments to protect wider areas with less manpower.

In the World War II era belligerents developed radar to detect airplanes, ships, and (later) ground targets. Subsequently, ground surveillance radar was coupled with steerable cameras that were automatically cued onto targets for quick evaluation of potential threats. These systems were large and very expensive.

In the military, the practice of small-force deployment can pose complex perimeter-protection problems. It has also created opportunities for innovation. Secure wireless communications, lightweight weaponry, faster transport, and portable perimeter protection have all become vital to the success of such missions. Compact surveillance radar (CSR), deployable in minutes, provides temporary or portable perimeter security.

While military applications have fostered innovation in more mobile, affordable perimeter protection, today's security threats have triggered a wave of new products engineered to protect important infrastructure such as airports, bridges, harbors, dams, and electrical substations. These products include thermal cameras, compact radar, microwave and radio-wave fences, and biometric scanning, most of which can be linked to smartphone or tablet technology. Cyberwarfare utilizes concepts of perimeter security deployed against threats to networks and to computer applications.

== See also ==
- Access control
- Crime scene
- Perimeter fence
