= Door security =

Methods to prevent unwanted entry

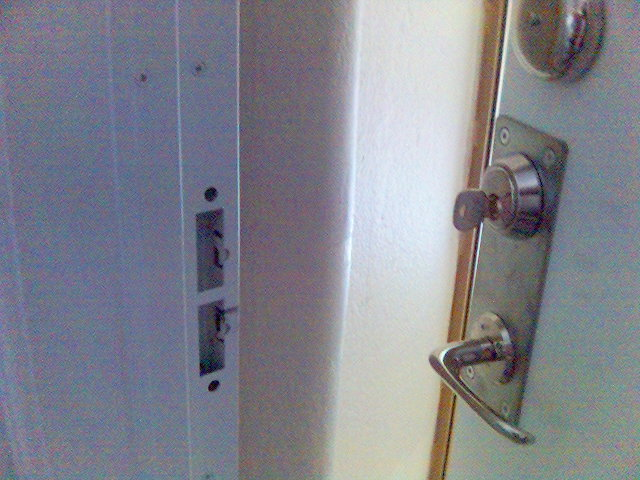
A metal doorframe with a strike plate built in: in other doors this would be a metal strikeplate in a wooden doorframe.

The term door security or door security gate may refer to any of a range of measures used to strengthen doors against door breaching, ram-raiding and lock picking, and prevent crimes such as burglary and home invasions. Door security is used in commercial and government buildings, as well as in residential settings.

Some strengthened doors function as fire doors to prevent or inhibit the spread of fire.

== Security devices ==
=== Alarms ===
Alarms: Designed to warn of burglaries.

=== Locks ===
- Smart locks can be used to limit door access to only people with an electronic key fob or near-field communication device, like a smartphone. These devices are popular with landlords, who can enable and disable digital access without physically mailing out keys. The locks can log the times of entry, and can trigger an alarm if they are struck during a break-in attempt.
- Deadbolts: Unlike common spring latches, the locking mechanism of these typically prevents the bolt from being retracted by force, or shimming, and it cannot be moved to the open position except by rotating the key.

=== Reinforcement ===
- Strike plate reinforcement can involve reinforcing the strike plate and/or the door frame, to prevent the strike plate from being rammed out of the frame.
- Door reinforcements: Various products are made to prevent delamination and or splitting of the door. Sheet steel plate can be placed behind or under the deadbolt and wrap the door edge to prevent breaking the door around the deadbolt. Heavy duty products that place plates on either side the door tied together with screws or bolts can be used to prevent delamination.
- Door chains: Allows the doors to be opened slightly to view outside while still remaining locked.
- Secondary, internal locks: Sliding bolts, hooks and speciality latches, metal blocks or bars mounted internally.
- Hinge screws: Longer or specialized screws that prevent the door from being simply pulled out after removing the hinge pins. Often the hinge pin itself is screwed, from the inside while the door is open, into the hinge to prevent removal of the hinge pin without first opening the door.

=== Other methods ===
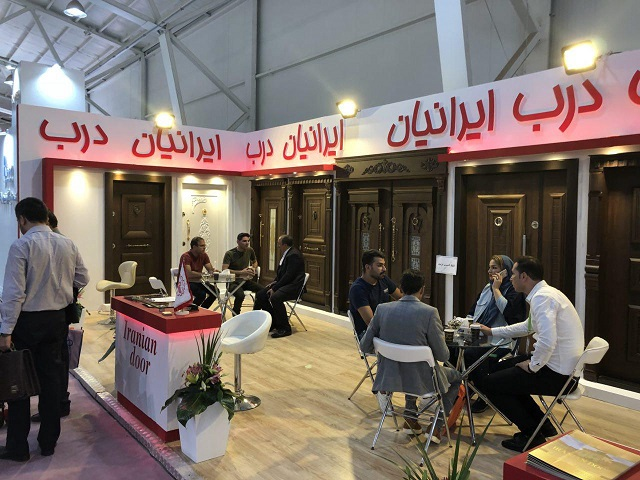
Iranian door security showroom

- Burglar deterrent CD or MP3 files: Home occupancy sounds recorded on a CD; the CD is played when the home owner is away, to mimic the home occupancy activities.
- Door viewers: Small fish-eye lenses that allow residents to view outside without opening the door.
- Door windows: There are three common methods to add security to windows in or beside doors: security bars and grates, security films (coatings applied to the glass in windows to reinforce it), or breakage resistant windows (plexiglas, lexan, and other glass replacement products).
- Visibility: Most police departments recommend the clearance of shrubs from near doorways to reduce the chance of a burglar being hidden from public view.

== Residential security ==
=== Common residential doors ===
The following are the types of doors typically used in residential applications: solid wood door, panel doors (hollow and solid core), metal skinned wood-edged doors and metal edge-wrapped doors, and Fiberglass doors (strongest of the residential type). Typically, door frames are solid wood. Residential doors also frequently contain wood.

Steel doors with Multi locking system are recommended by construction professionals as important equipment in your security checklist. This type of door often comes with a wooden finish to maintain a natural aesthetic in their external appearance.

Security tests by Consumer Reports magazine in the 1990s found that many residential doors fail or delaminate when force is applied to them. Solid wood doors withstood more force than the very common metal skinned wood-edged doors used in newer construction. A broad range door manufacturer, Premdor (now Masonite) once stated in one of its 1990s brochures entitled "Premdor Entry Systems" page 6 that "The results of tests were overwhelming, Steel edged doors outperform wood-edged doors by a ratio of 7 to 1. When you consider the practically two-thirds of all illegal entries were made through doors... One hit of 100 lb lbf strike force broke the wood-edged stile and opened the door. To actually open the steel-edged door required 7 strikes of 100 lb pressure [force]." Most door manufactures offer a number of different types of doors with varying levels of strength.

Consumer Reports also reported in its test results that door frames often split with little force applied and lower quality deadbolts simply failed when force was applied to the door.

The Chula Vista Residential Burglary Reduction Project which studied over 1,000 incidents found that "methods found to have relatively low effectiveness included: sliding glass door braces, such as wooden dowels, as opposed to sliding door channel or pin locks; deadbolts installed in the front door only; and outdoor lights on dusk-to-dawn timers".

=== Burglary tactics ===
The Chula Vista Residential Burglary-Reduction Project yielded the following findings: "From victim interviews, we learned that in 87% of the break-ins that occurred when intruders defeated locked doors with tools such as screwdrivers or crowbars, the burglars targeted the one door that had no deadbolt lock ... not one burglar attempted to break a double-pane window during the course of successful or attempted burglary."

== See also ==
- Access badge
- Access control
- Alarm management
- Biometrics
- Closed-circuit television
- Electronic lock
- ID Card
- Keycards
- Locksmithing
- Lock picking
- Magnetic stripe card
- Security lighting
- Surveillance
- Window security
