= Perimeter fence =

Structure used to mark and enforce a boundary

A perimeter fence system is a fence that visually demarcates and protects a property by blocking entry at the property's perimeter. The level of protection offered varies according to the threat to the perimeter. Different types of perimeter fencing include:

- Chain-link fencing
- Metal railings
- Palisade fencing
- Rolled mesh fencing
- Timber fencing
- Welded wire mesh fence fencing

Vertical bar fencing has been the most popular form of perimeter fence since the 1980s. In the 2000s, welded wire mesh and acoustic barriers have become popular. Vertical bar, acoustic barriers and welded mesh are used in commercial projects and landmarks and transport hubs.

Sensors may be attached to the fence that generate alarms when they detect someone cutting, climbing, lifting or otherwise bypassing the fence.

== Purpose ==
The purpose of perimeter fence is to act as a deterrent, stopping or preventing the incident and reducing the level of risk. Doing so discourages the perpetrator from completing a harmful event. For example, a high wall with fence posts that protects a property discourages criminals from intruding and, when an incident occurs, increases the time it takes to carry it out.

To meet the security requirements of an area, a thorough analysis must be conducted to determine the level of risk. The greater the probability of the threat occurring, the greater the level of risk. Being able to assess this risk allows you to gather all the data to study and solve a security problem. Then It will be necessary to consider all types of threats that may occur such as: theft, intrusion, robbery, kidnapping, and vandalism.

== Security systems ==
The perimeter security system is made up of methods, and procedures, services.

Security systems are either passive or active.

=== Passive ===
Passive security systems consist of physical methods that separate possible threats from what needs to be protected. The purpose of these methods is to discourage attempts to overcome, bypass, lift, knock down or climb over them as much as possible. Obstacles are the more efficient the longer it takes to cross them.

Passive safety systems include the following elements:

- armored doors
- armored drawers
- reinforced doors
- metal fences
- reinforced walls
- gates
- turnstiles
- vehicle collision barriers
- shatterproof glass
- bulletproof glass
- general reinforcement
- security locks

=== Active ===
An active security system uses electric, electronic, and telephone methods that:

- monitor the area and facility through event detection;
- evaluate the information;
- deter unacceptable activities;
- generate a response;
- evaluate the information and present it to the appropriate response system (often a remote operator).

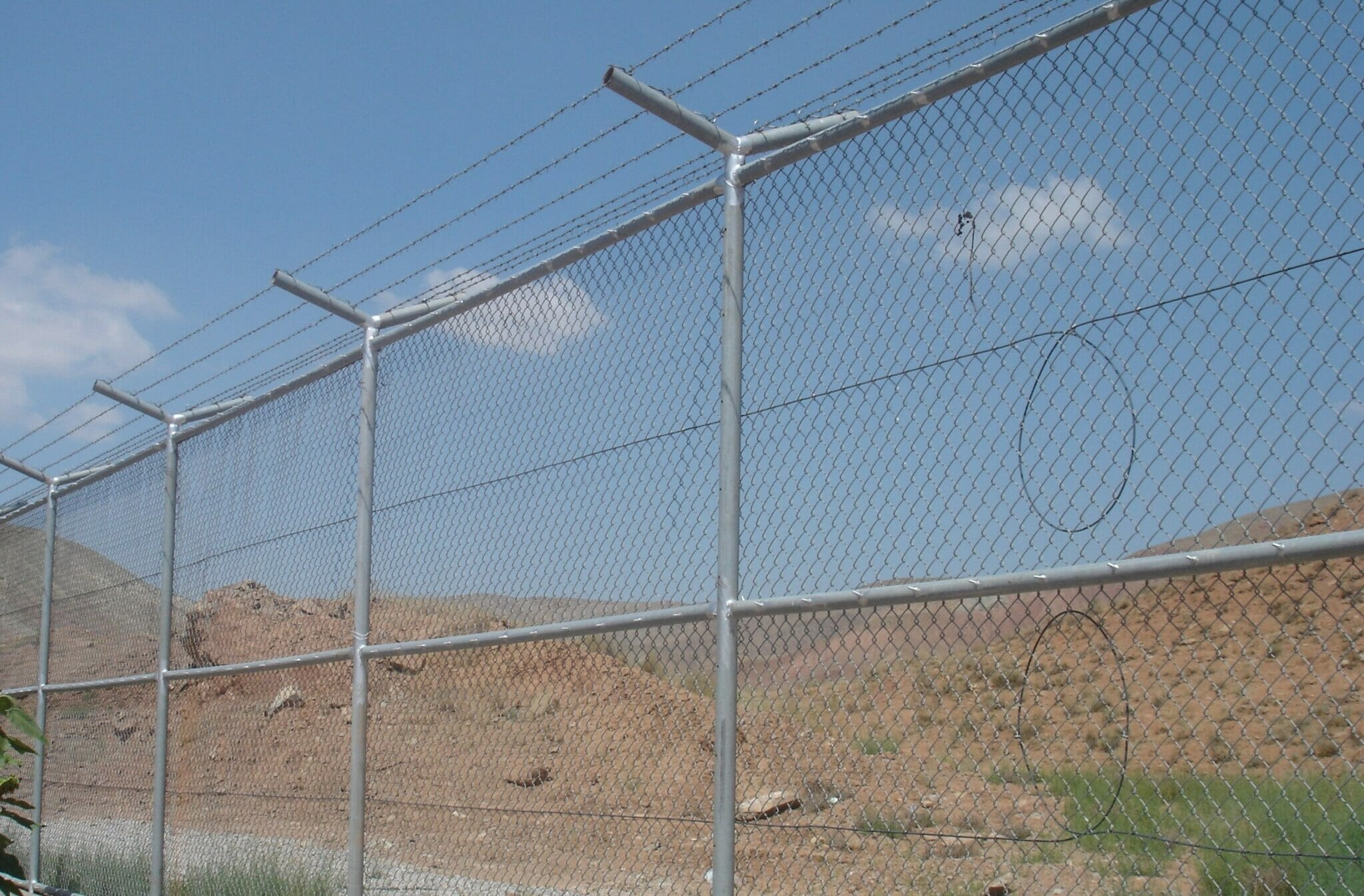
Fiber Optic Fence Sensor

The elements that make up the active security system are:

- intrusion detection sensors
- peripheral alarm control unit
- means of deterrence (local)
- means for communicating information
- remote alarm receiving unit
- accessories
- local electrical interconnection network
- primary and secondary power supplies
- means of activating and deactivating the subsystem
- means of event recording
- means of image acquisition and recording
- means of human/machine interface
- security service
- telecommunication network for sending data to a remote-control center

=== Hybrid ===
To move a high-risk situation to a lower-risk, more secure situation, it is necessary to implement a passive security system. Greater security can be achieved by combining a passive system with an active system. Alarm information must be immediately transmitted, presented, and assessed by an operator or automated response system, triggering an appropriate response.

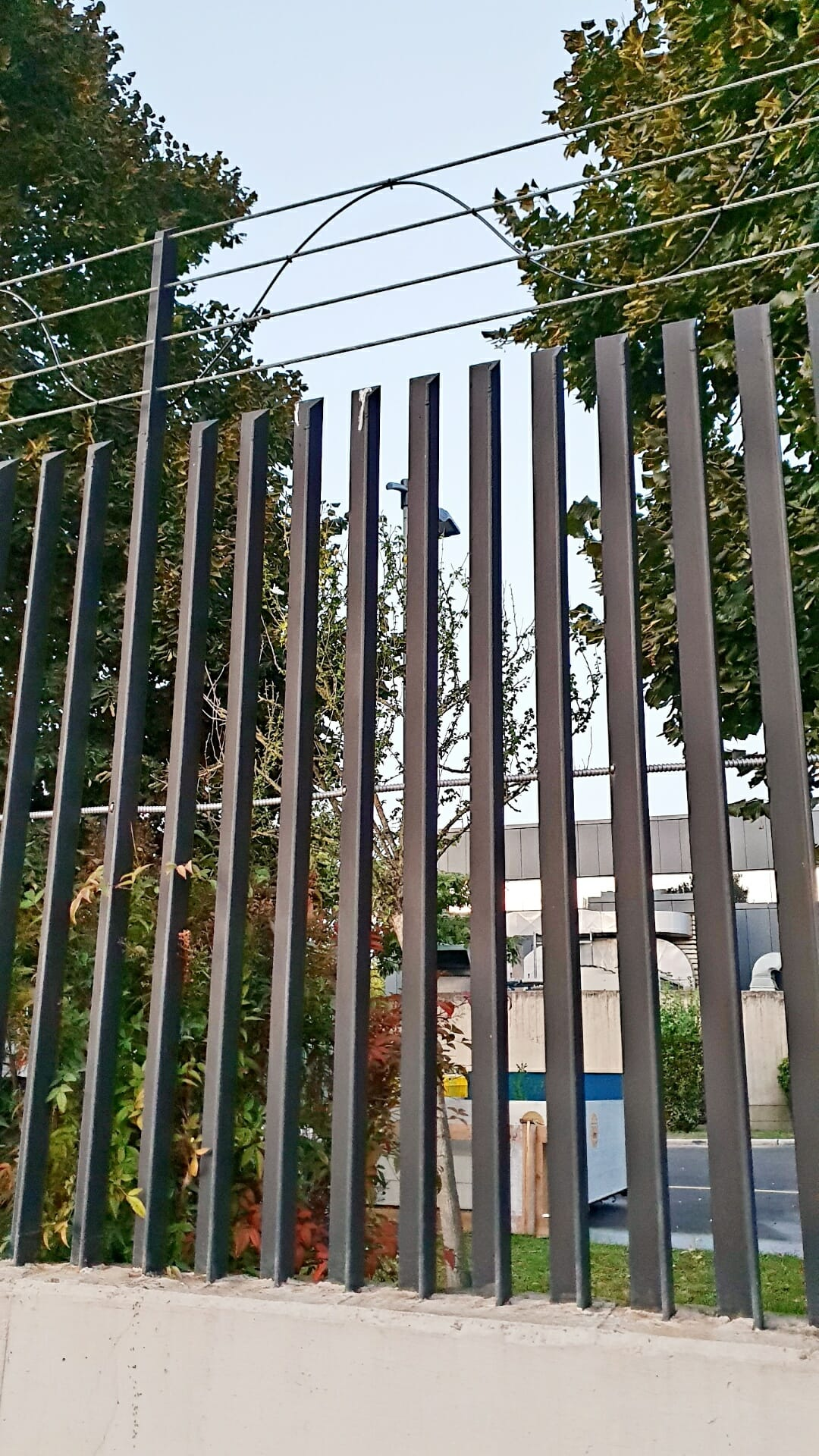
Fense Sensor on Fence and Outrigging

A proper integration of the two systems reduces the time between detection and intervention.

== See also ==
- Privacy fencing
- Security alarm
