= Compact surveillance radar =

Compact surveillance radar are small lightweight radar systems that have a wide coverage area and are able to track people and vehicles in range and azimuth angle. They weigh less than 10 pounds, consume less than 15 W of power and are easily deployed in large numbers.

Compact surveillance radar have the same characteristics of the larger ground surveillance radar (GSR) namely; the ability to track many moving targets simultaneously, all-weather day and night operation, wide coverage areas and the ability to track targets and cue cameras automatically.

The first reference to compact surveillance radar was by the Defense Review in 2012 with regards to the SpotterRF M600 Radar.

Compact Surveillance Radar as a category was first pioneered in 2009 by SpotterRF, now called Spotter Global with the first production radars being available to special forces in early 2011.

Spotter was followed by Magos System from Israel in 2017 with launch of the SR-500.

Later Echodyne entered the Compact Surveillance Radar market in 2019 with the Echoguard.
