= Foot-candle =

Unit of illuminance

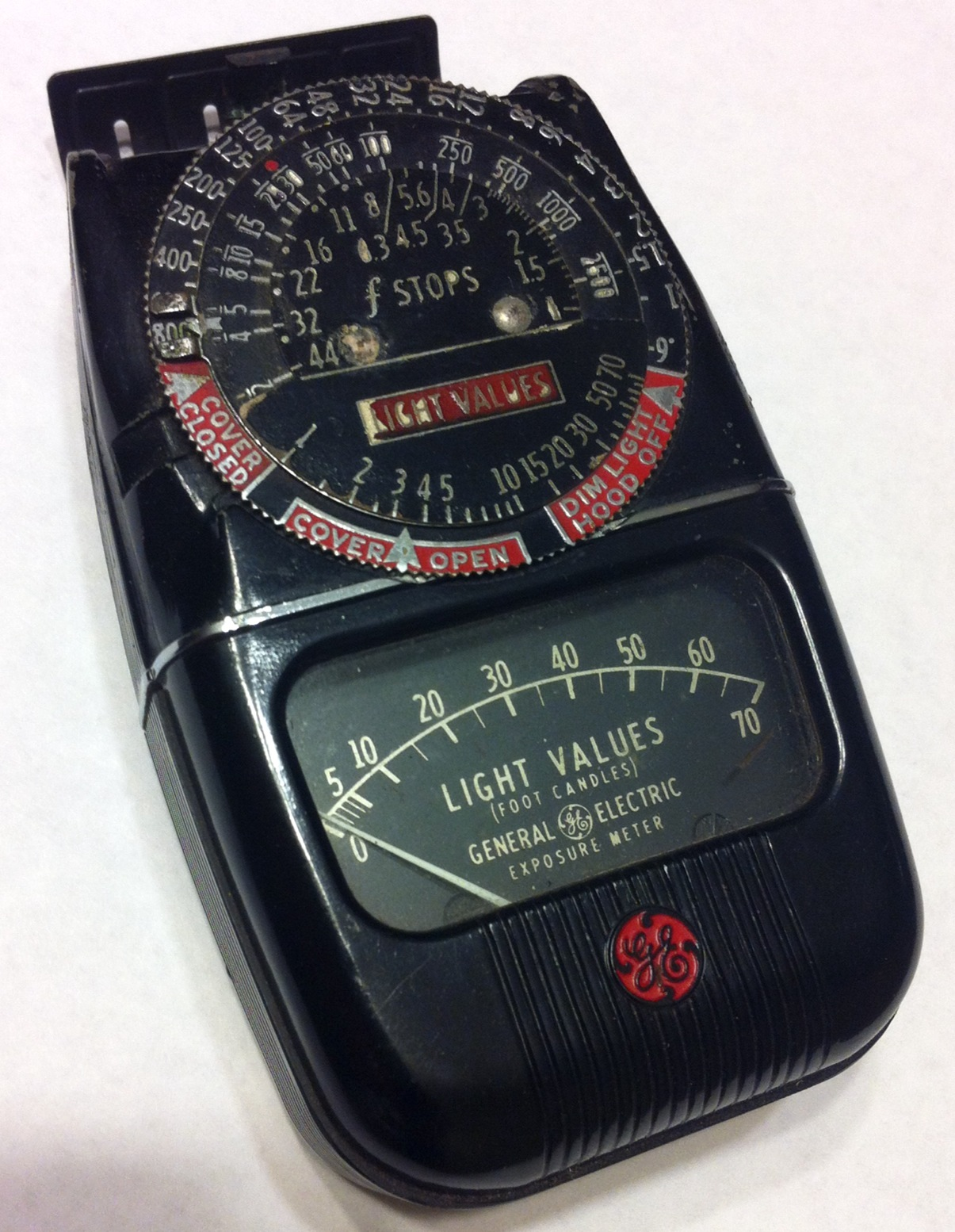
- General Electric Light Meter used in photography to measure light values in foot-candles.

General information
- Unit system: United States customary units
- Unit of: illuminance
- Symbol: fc

Conversions
1 fc in ...	... is equal to ...
- US: 1 lm/ft^{2}
- SI: 10.764 lux (lm/m^{2})
- CGS: 1.076×10^{−3} phots

A foot-candle (sometimes foot candle; abbreviated fc, lm/ft^{2}, or sometimes ft-c) is a non-SI unit of illuminance or light intensity. The foot-candle is defined as one lumen per square foot. This unit is commonly used in lighting layouts in parts of the world where United States customary units are used, mainly the United States. Nearly all of the world uses the corresponding SI derived unit lux, defined as one lumen per square meter.

The foot-candle is defined as the illuminance of the inside surface of a one-foot-radius sphere with a point source of one candela at its center. Alternatively, it can be defined as the illuminance of one lumen on a one-square foot surface with a uniform distribution. Given the relation between candela and lumen, the two definitions listed are identical, with the second one potentially being easier to relate to in some everyday situations.

One foot-candle is equal to approximately 10.764 lux. In many practical applications, as when measuring room illumination, it is often not needed to measure illuminance more accurately than ±10%; in these situations it is sufficient to think of one foot-candle as about ten lux.

== Use ==
In the US lighting industry, foot-candles are a common unit of measurement used by architects to calculate adequate lighting levels. Foot-candles are also commonly used in the museum and gallery fields in the US, where lighting levels must be carefully controlled to conserve light-sensitive objects such as prints, photographs, and paintings, the colors of which fade when exposed to bright light for a lengthy period.

In the motion picture cinematography field in the US, reflective light meters(spot meters) are used to measure the number of foot-candles present, which are used to calculate the intensity of motion picture lights(although lighting contrasts can be adjusted by an incident meter as well), allowing cinematographers to set up proper lighting-contrast ratios when filming.

Since light intensity is the primary factor in the photosynthesis of plants, US horticulturalists often measure and discuss optimum intensity for various plants in foot-candles.

== Examples ==
Full, unobstructed sunlight can have an intensity of up to 10,000 fc. or more. An overcast day will produce an intensity of around 100 fc. The intensity of light near a window can range from 100 to 460 fc, depending on the orientation of the window, time of year and latitude.

Indoor lighting for residences seeks to provide 5–40 fc for general spaces and 70–90 fc for work spaces.

Lighting requirements for commercial spaces range from 5 fc for storage spaces to 200 fc for visually intensive work.

== SI photometry units ==
SI photometry quantities
Quantity		Unit		Dimension (Note: The symbols in this column denote dimensions; "L", "T" and "J" are for length, time, and luminous intensity respectively, not the symbols for the units litre, tesla, and joule.)	Notes
Name	Symbol (Note: Standards organizations recommend that photometric quantities be denoted with a subscript "v" (for "visual") to avoid confusion with radiometric or photon quantities. For example: USA Standard Letter Symbols for Illuminating Engineering USAS Z7.1-1967, Y10.18-1967)	Name	Symbol	Dimension	Notes
Luminous energy	Q_{v} (Note: Alternative symbols sometimes seen: W for luminous energy, P or F for luminous flux, and ρ for luminous efficacy of a source.)	lumen second	lm⋅s	T⋅J	The lumen second is sometimes called the talbot.
Luminous flux, luminous power	Φ_{v}	lumen (= candela steradian)	lm (= cd⋅sr)	J	Luminous energy per unit time
Luminous intensity	I_{v}	candela (= lumen per steradian)	cd (= lm/sr)	J	Luminous flux per unit solid angle
Luminance	L_{v}	candela per square metre	cd/m^{2} (= lm/(sr⋅m^{2}))	L^{−2}⋅J	Luminous flux per unit solid angle per unit projected source area. The candela per square metre is sometimes called the nit.
Illuminance	E_{v}	lux (= lumen per square metre)	lx (= lm/m^{2})	L^{−2}⋅J	Luminous flux incident on a surface
Luminous exitance, luminous emittance	M_{v}	lumen per square metre	lm/m^{2}	L^{−2}⋅J	Luminous flux emitted from a surface
Luminous exposure	H_{v}	lux second	lx⋅s	L^{−2}⋅T⋅J	Time-integrated illuminance
Luminous energy density	ω_{v}	lumen second per cubic metre	lm⋅s/m^{3}	L^{−3}⋅T⋅J	
Luminous efficacy (of radiation)	K	lumen per watt	lm/W	M^{−1}⋅L^{−2}⋅T^{3}⋅J	Ratio of luminous flux to radiant flux
Luminous efficacy (of a source)	η	lumen per watt	lm/W	M^{−1}⋅L^{−2}⋅T^{3}⋅J	Ratio of luminous flux to power consumption
Luminous efficiency, luminous coefficient	V			1	Luminous efficacy normalized by the maximum possible efficacy
See also: SI; Photometry; Radiometry

== See also ==
- Photometry (optics) for more on the measurement of light
