= Razor wire =

Mesh of metal strips with sharp edges to prevent trespassing

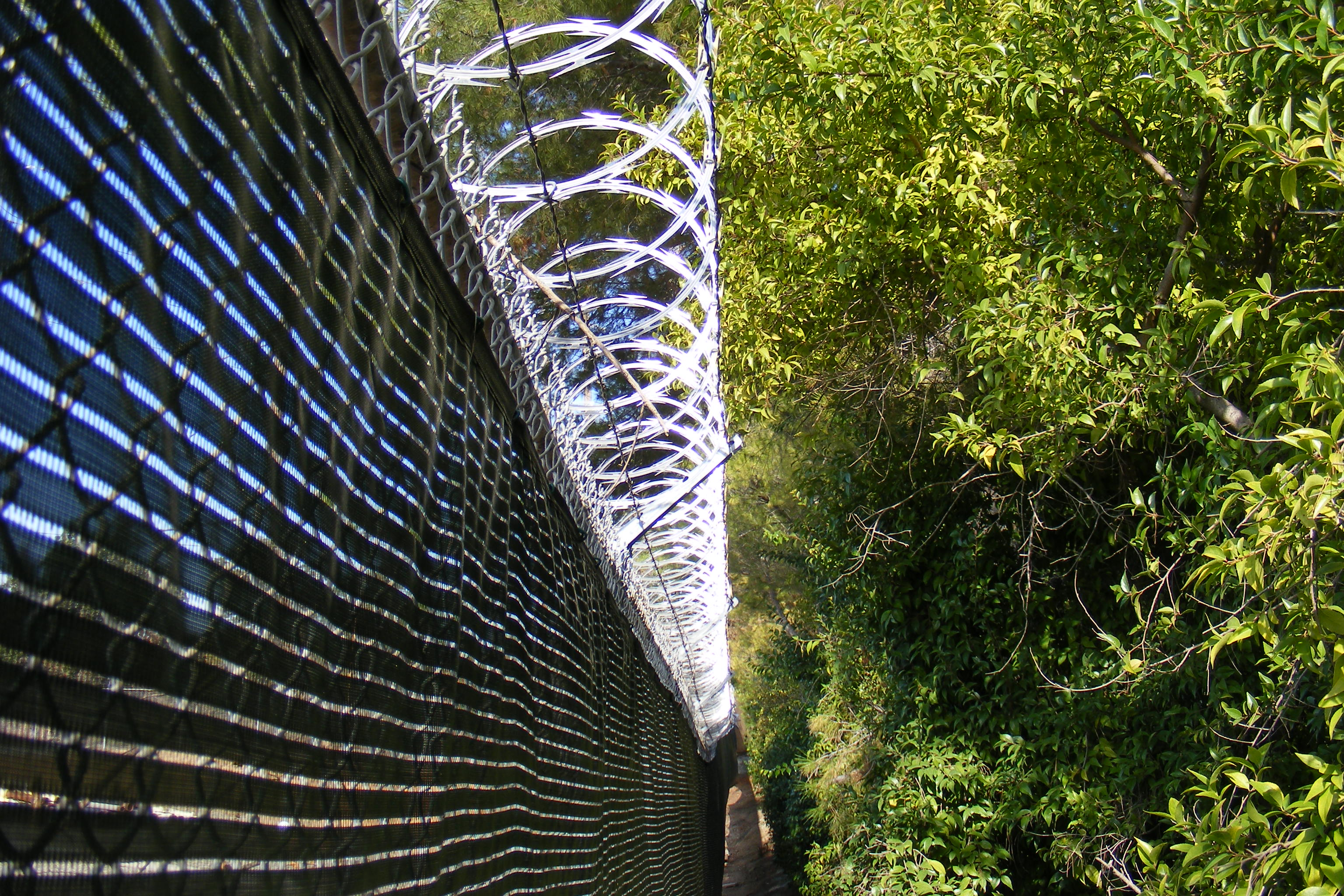
Razor wire—long-barb type on top of a chain link privacy-fence surrounding a utility power sub-station

Barbed tape, or razor wire, is a security barrier made of metal strips with sharp edges, designed to deter unauthorized passage across a boundary.

== Use ==
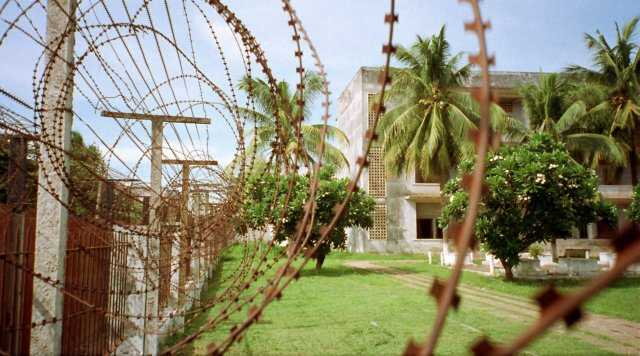
Short barb razor wire at Tuol Sleng Genocide Museum in Cambodia

Due to its dangerous nature, razor wire/barbed tape and similar fencing/barrier materials are prohibited in some locales. Norway prohibits any barbed wire except in combination with other fencing, in order to protect domesticated animals from exposure.

== Construction ==
Razor wire has a central strand of high tensile strength wire, and a steel tape punched into a shape with barbs. The steel tape is then cold-crimped tightly to the wire everywhere except for the barbs. Flat barbed tape is very similar, but has no central reinforcement wire. The process of combining the two is called roll forming.

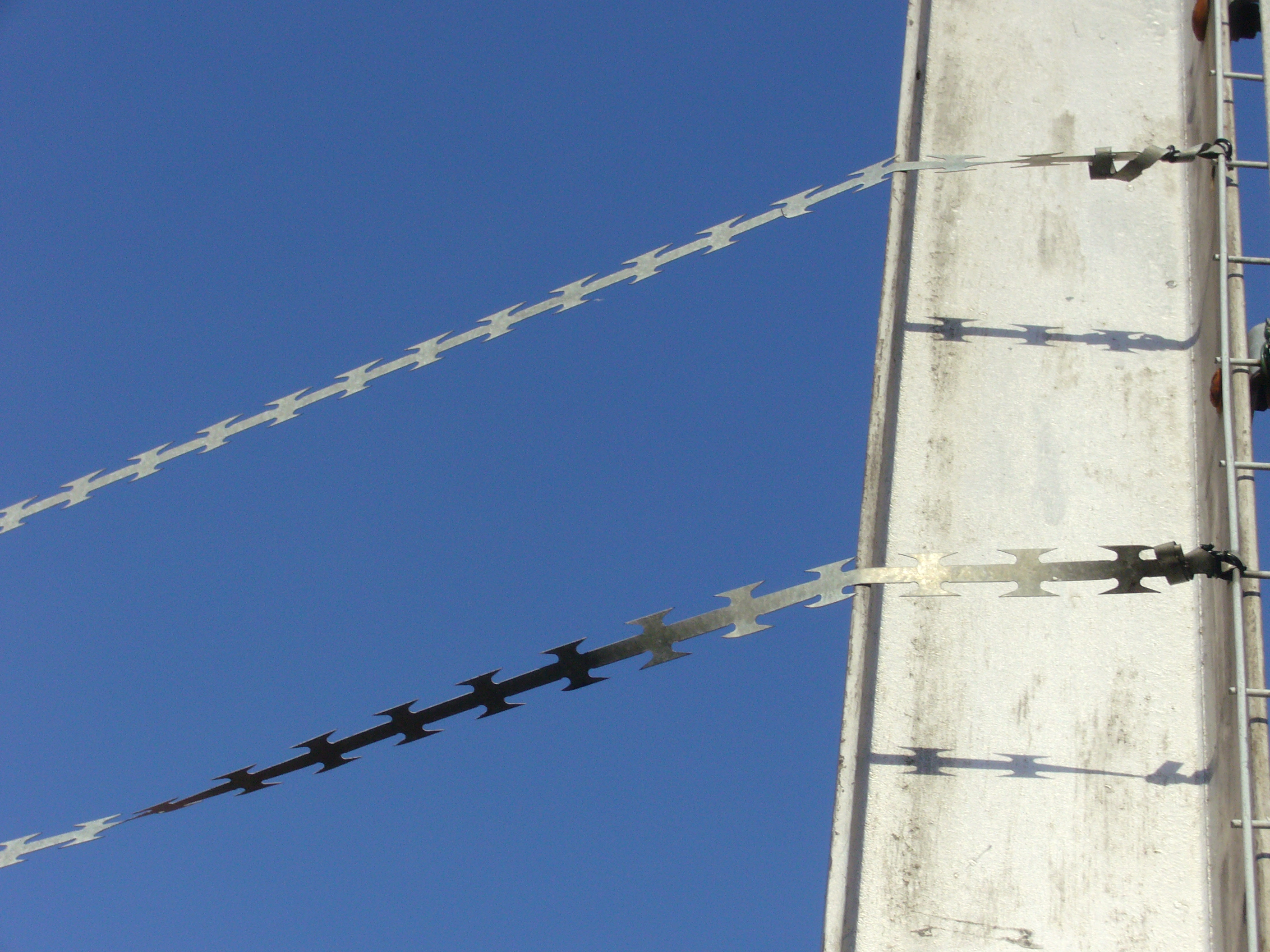
Barbed tape on a fence

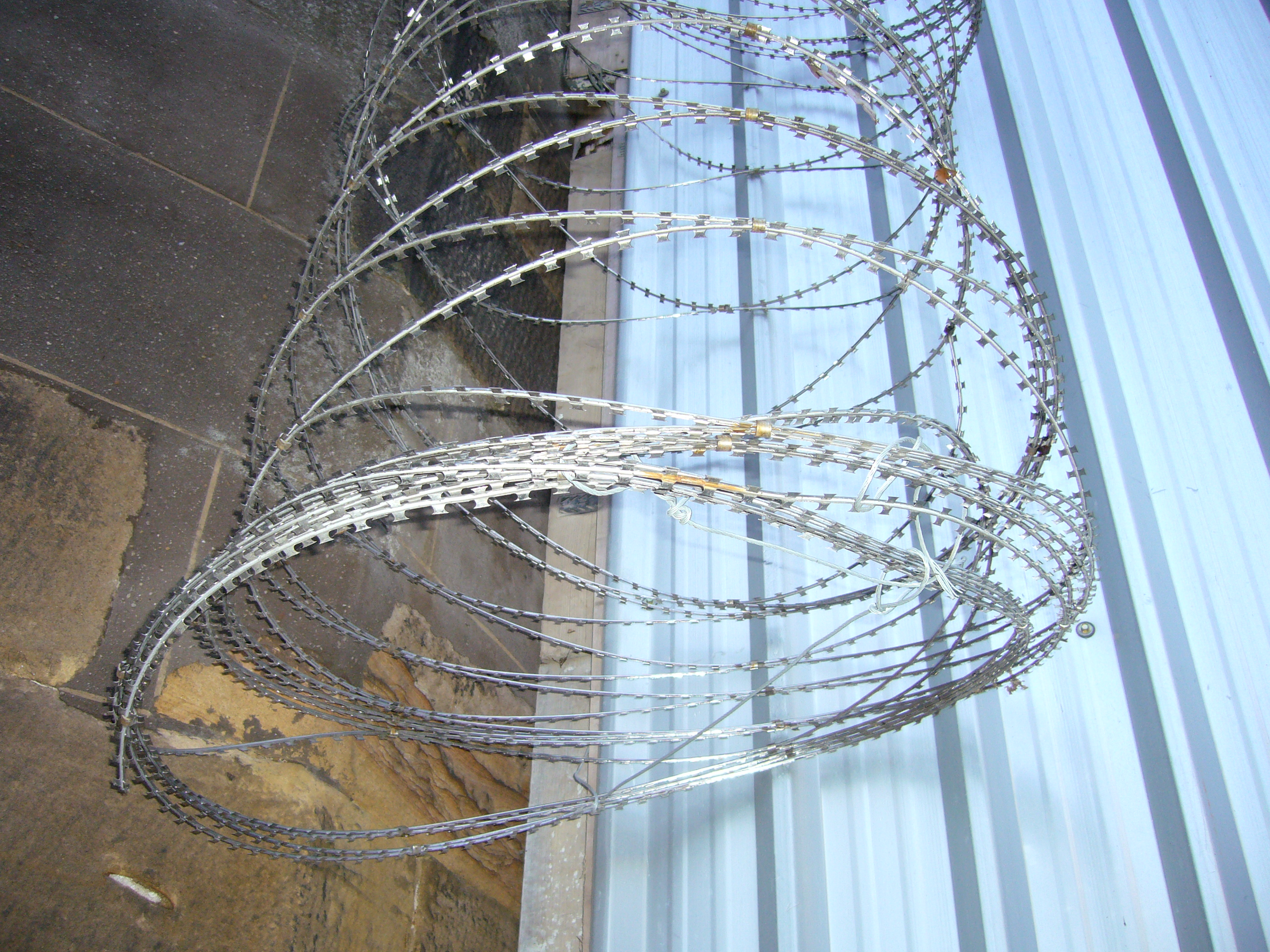
Short barb razor wire with central reinforcement

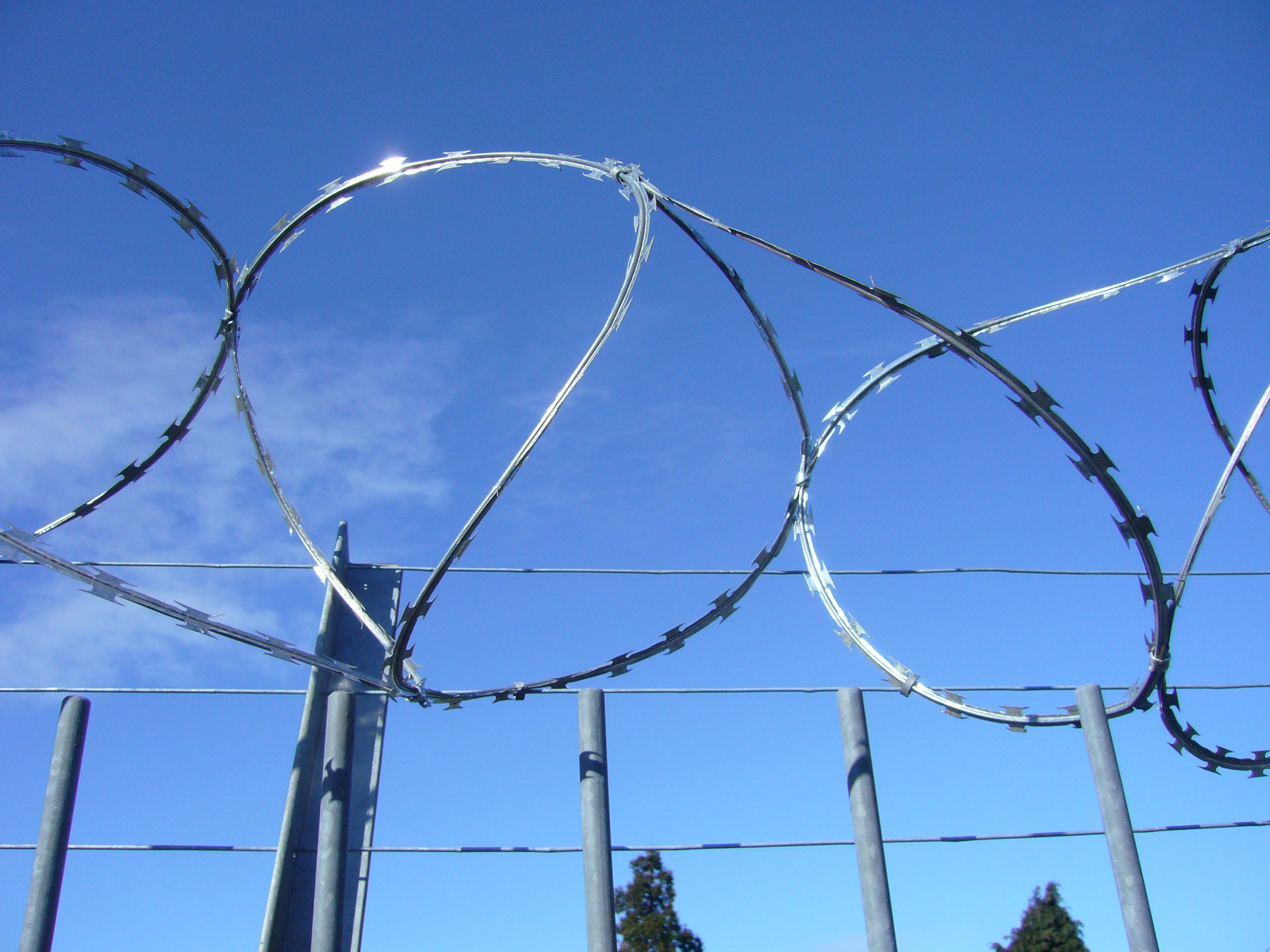
Medium barb razor wire

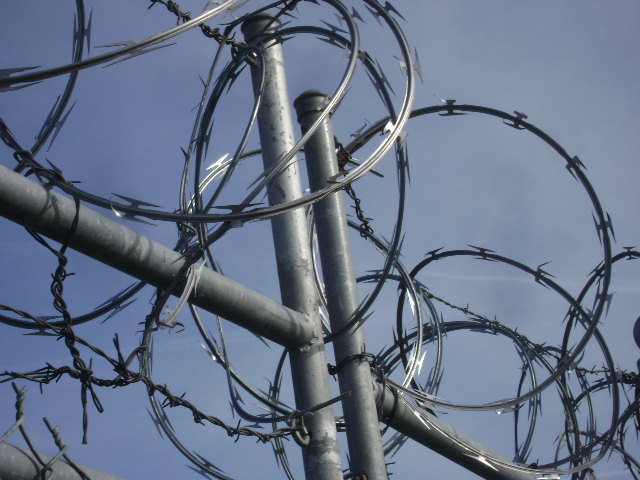
Long barb razor wire on a fence. At the bottom there is some barbed wire.

== See also ==
- Access control
- Environmental design
- Physical security
- Wire obstacle
- Concertina wire
- Trespassing
