= Perimeter intrusion detection =

Sensor that detects the presence of an intruder

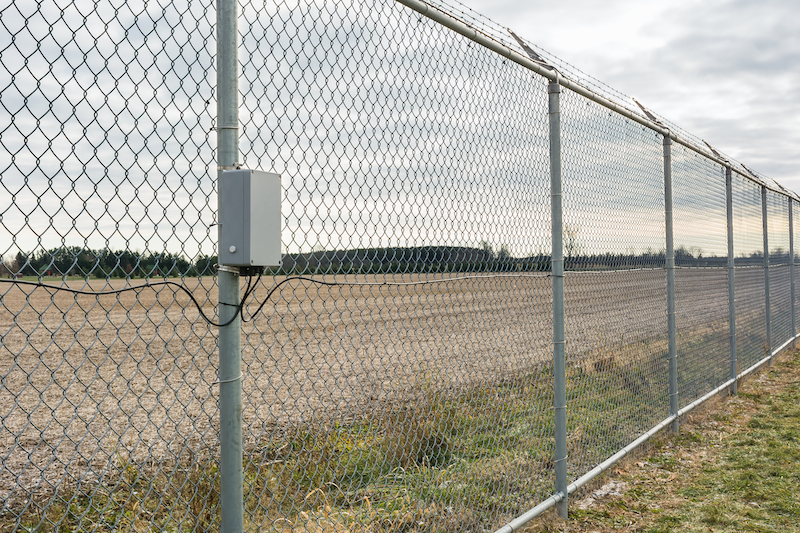
A fence-mounted perimeter intrusion detection system installed on a chain link fence.

A perimeter intrusion detection system (PIDS) is a device or sensor that detects the presence of an intruder attempting to breach the physical perimeter of a property, building, or other secured area. A PIDS is typically deployed as part of an overall security system and is often found in high-security environments such as correctional facilities, airports, military bases, and nuclear plants.

== Types of PIDS ==
A wide range of intrusion detection technologies exist in the current marketplace. The U.S. Army, as part of their reference material for personnel responsible for planning and executing security programs, divides PIDS technologies into the following categories:

- Active IR
- Break wire
- Electrostatic field
- Fence detection (typically a fiber optic, microphonic cable or accelerometer-based sensor mounted on the fence)
- Ground motion
- Magnetic
- Microwave detectors
- Near-IR beam break
- Passive IR
- Ported coaxial cable
- Taut wire
- Seismic

== Primary Application ==
A PIDS typically acts as an early warning system, alerting a site's alarm system while the intruder is still at the perimeter and not yet in a building or other interior area. A PIDS isn't a replacement for surveillance cameras. The two technologies work together, with PIDS providing early intrusion detection while cameras provide real-time assessment capabilities. PIDS are often integrated with other security products like signage, security lighting, intercom systems, or loudspeakers to help deter potential intruders.
