= Security lighting =

Lighting to deter trespassing on a property

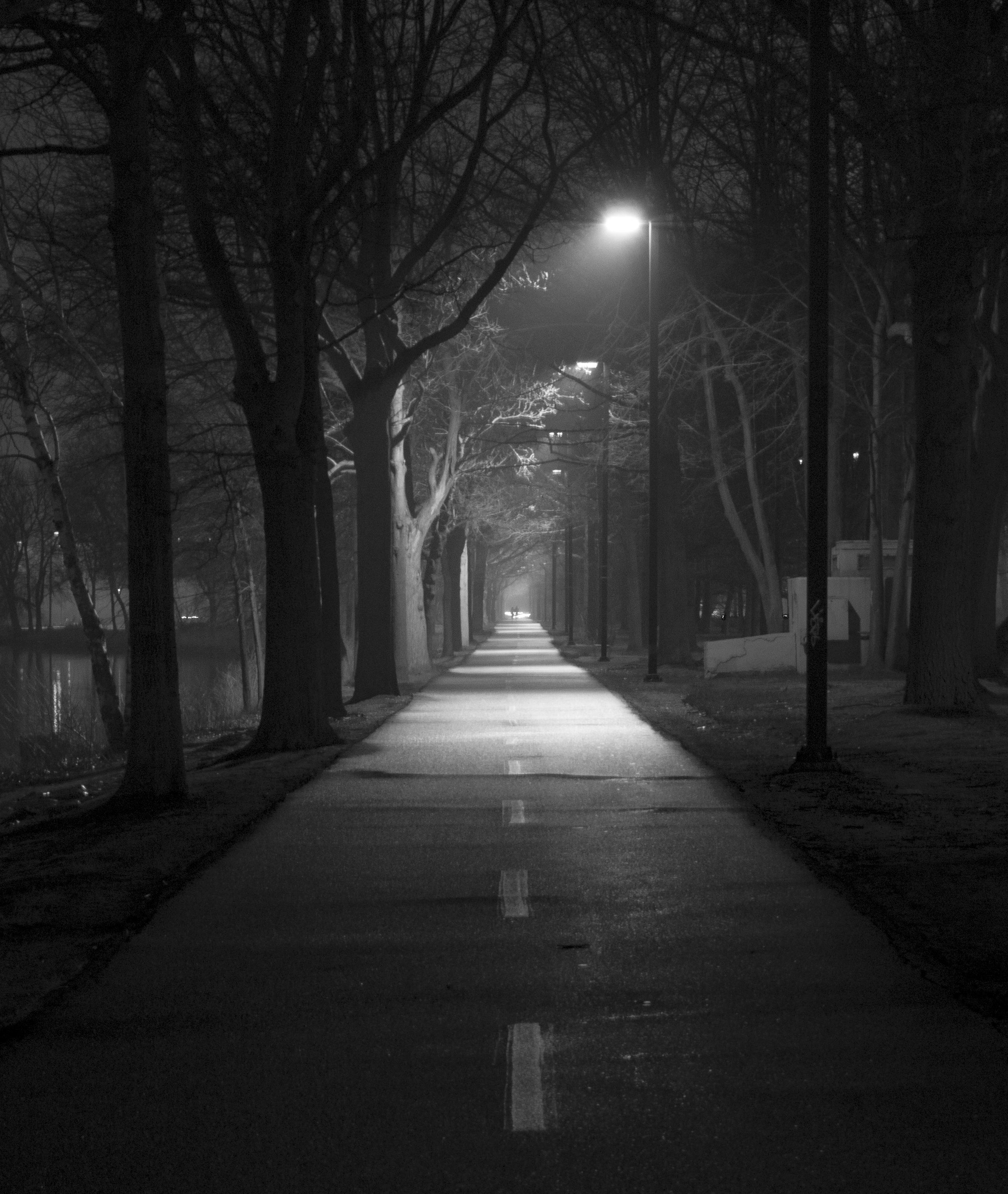
Lighting installed along a bicycle path in the United States. Lighting like this in public spaces is usually installed to increase personal safety and reduce crime.

In the field of physical security, security lighting is lighting that intended to deter or detect intrusions, criminal, or other anti-social activity occurring in a location, either publicly or privately owned. It is also used to increase a feeling of safety. Lighting is an important component of crime prevention through environmental design.

== Use ==
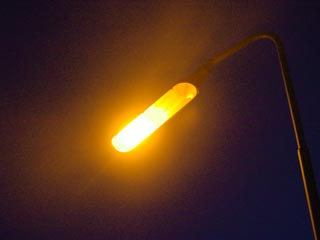
A sodium vapor light. This type is often used as security lighting.

Security lighting is widely used in residential, commercial, industrial, institutional, and military settings. Some examples of security lighting include floodlights and low pressure sodium vapour lights. Most lights intended to be left on all night are high-intensity discharge lamps as these have good energy efficiency, thus reducing the cost of running a lamp for such long periods.

A disadvantage of low pressure sodium lamps is that the colour is pure yellow, so the illuminated scene is seen without any colour differentiation. Consequently, high pressure sodium vapour lamps (which are still yellowish, but closer to golden white) are also used, at the cost of greater running expenses and increased light pollution. High pressure sodium lamps also take slightly longer to restrike after a power interruption.

LED-based security lighting is becoming increasingly popular, due to its low electrical consumption (compared to non-LED lighting technologies), long lifespan, and options for different color spectrum ranges.

Other lights may be activated by sensors such as passive infrared sensors (PIRs), turning on only when a person (or other mammal) approaches. PIR sensor activation can increase both the deterrent effect (since the intruder knows that he has been detected) and the detection effect (since a person will be attracted to the sudden increase in light). Some PIR units can be set up to sound a chime as well as turn on the light. Most modern units have a photocell so that they only turn on when it is dark.

To reduce light pollution, the International Dark-Sky Association recommends the use of downward-facing security lights that preserve and protect the night time environment.

During the South African energy crisis increased rates of metal theft, house breaking and robberies were reported in areas effected by the loss of security lighting due to a loss of electricity in some urban areas.

== Impact ==
The impact of security lighting is debated, with existing academic literature regarding the impact of street lighting on crime rates being contested. A large segment of the research asserts a correlation between enhanced illumination and a reduction in criminal activity, a finding that aligns with the principles of Situational Crime Prevention. Although accounts differ by what margin and in what context security lighting is most effective. Conversely, alternative studies indicate a lack of empirical evidence to suggest that street lighting improvements result in a measurable decrease in reported crime.

A 2002 meta-analysis of thirteen other studies found that improved lighting tended to result in an overall reduction of crime by around 20% in treatment areas when compared to control areas that did not receive improved lighting. A 2019 study in New York City found that the provision of street lights, an important type of security lighting, resulted in a "36 percent reduction in nighttime outdoor index crimes." A 2025 study in Philadelphia found that in urban areas with active security lighting overall crime rates declined by up-to 8% during nighttime hours, and up-to a 4% reduction during daytime hours.

However security lighting to prevent intrusions may be counter-productive. Bright, unshielded floodlights may also prevent people from noticing criminal activity, and help criminals see what they are doing. An anecdotal report indicated that turning off lights halved the number of thefts and burglary in Övertorneå, Sweden. In the early seventies, the public-school system in San Antonio, Texas, began leaving many of its school buildings, parking lots, and other property dark at night and found that the no-lights policy not only reduced energy costs but also dramatically cut vandalism. A 1991 academic study in the London Borough of Wandsworth, England found that better street lighting had little impact on crime but did significantly increase feelings of safety by the public.

== Limitations ==
An important limitation to the usefulness of security lighting is the simple fact that it is only useful at night. This is particularly significant for home owners because, contrary to a widespread myth, most household burglaries occur during the day, when the occupants are away at work or shopping.

As with any lighting, security lighting can reduce night vision, making it harder to see into areas that are unlit or are in shadow. Non-uniform illumination may also interfere with surveillance systems, as the wide dynamic range of security cameras may have difficulty adjusting to the changes in light intensity.

== Planning considerations ==
While adequate lighting around a physical structure is deployed to reduce the risk of an intrusion, it is critical that the lighting be designed carefully as poorly arranged lighting can create glare which actually obstructs vision. Studies have shown that many criminals are aware of this effect and actively exploit it. The optimal design will also depend on whether the area will be watched directly by humans or by closed-circuit television, and on the location of the observers or cameras.

Security lighting may be subject to vandalism, possibly to reduce its effectiveness for a subsequent intrusion attempt. Thus security lights should either be mounted very high, or else protected by wire mesh or tough polycarbonate shields. Other lamps may be completely recessed from view and access, with the light directed out through a light pipe or reflected from a polished aluminium or stainless steel mirror. For similar reasons high security installations may provide a stand-by power supply for their security lighting.

Some typical considerations include:

- Reduce and prevent glare and situations mentioned above
  - Shielded or full cut-off (FCO) lamp housings which conceal the bulb could be used, which should direct light onto the ground or target and away from observers. These lights should send no light above 80 degrees from the nadir. Lighting should be bright enough, and not "as bright as possible". In many cases a good rule of thumb is 0.5 watts per square metre (0.05 watts per square foot). This might need to be increased in complex environments, but conversely can be reduced in very open environments. Multiple lamps of moderate power instead of a few powerful lamps will reduce glare, provide more even illumination with reduced pools of shadow, and provide some redundancy if one lamp's bulb blows out or develops a bad ballast.
- Prevent malicious tampering or interference. This means that besides the lamp itself, the entire circuit from the source (electric company or generator), through the wires, to the lamp and back should be protected.
  - Luminaires should be accessible so that the maintainer can replace blown bulbs as quickly as possible and clean the luminaires periodically. However they should be protected or somehow made inaccessible to tampering.
  - Ensure the electric meter box is locked or inaccessible, or else power the lights from a different line.
  - Control and power lines, where outside or vulnerable, should be either buried well underground (in conduits preferably) or at a height of at least 8 metres (about 24 feet).
  - Ideally multiple circuits should be used to prevent an accidental or malicious short or cut causing all illumination to fail.

=== U.S. NRC, 10 CFR 73.55(i)(6) Illumination ===
For nuclear power plants in the United States (U.S.), per the U.S. Nuclear Regulatory Commission (NRC), 10 CFR Part 73, [security] lighting is mentioned four (4) times. The most notable mentioning contained in 10 CFR 73.55(i)(6) Illumination, which clearly identifies that licensees "-shall provide a minimum illumination level of 0.2 foot-candles, measured horizontally at ground level, in the isolation zones and appropriate exterior areas within the protected area-". ^{[Ref]} This is also the minimum illumination level specified in Table H–2 Minimum Night Firing Criteria of 10 CFR 73 Appendix H, for night firing. Per 10 CFR 73.46(b)(7) "-Tactical Response Team members, armed response personnel, and guards shall qualify and requalify, at least every 12 months, for day and night firing with assigned weapons in accordance with Appendix H-"; therefore on said respective shooting range at night per Appendix H, Table H-2, "-all courses [shall have] 0.2 foot-candles at center mass of target area-" applicable to handguns, shotguns, and rifles. ^{[Ref]} 1 foot-candle is approximately 10.76 lux, therefore the minimum illumination requirements for the above sections also reflect 2.152 lux.

== See also ==
- Access control
- Environmental design
- Light pollution
- Physical security
- Security
- Security engineering
