= Reverse 911 =

Emergency Communications Protocol

Reverse 911 is a public safety communications technology used by public safety organizations in Canada and the United States to communicate with groups of people in a defined geographic area. The system uses a database of telephone numbers and associated addresses, which, when tied into geographic information systems (GIS), can be used to deliver recorded emergency notifications to a selected set of telephone service subscribers.

== Background ==
Reverse 911 was developed by Sigma Micro Corporation, later known as Sigma Communications, in 1993. After a number of corporate acquisitions, Motorola Solutions ultimately gained ownership of the technology and rights developed by Sigma, and Motorola has folded Reverse 911 into their Vesta suite of public safety systems.

== Case studies ==
The system is used to notify residents in emergency situations, for example:

- During the 2010 Boston water emergency, government agencies used the system to notify a large number of Boston-area residents in particular neighborhoods to boil water before drinking.
- During the much more contained Marvin Heemeyer 2004 bulldozer rampage in Granby, Colorado, authorities used Reverse 911 to notify the approximately 1,500 residents of the town to evacuate from the bulldozer's path.
- During the 2011 Tōhoku earthquake and tsunami, Seaside and Astoria, Oregon, residents were notified by Reverse 911 and sirens to evacuate low-lying areas.
- When the improvised explosive devices in the Aurora, Colorado, apartment of mass murderer James Holmes were detonated by police, Reverse 911 was used to notify nearby residents of the evacuation order.
- On December 14, 2012, Reverse 911 was used to notify parents in the Sandy Hook community of Newtown, Connecticut, of the Sandy Hook Elementary School shooting.
- During the manhunt for suspects involved in the Boston Marathon bombing, Reverse 911 was used to notify residents of Watertown, Massachusetts, to remain in their homes.
- In October 2014, some Dallas, Texas, residents were notified of the city's second Ebola infection case by a Reverse 911 call.
- In 2023, residents of East Nantmeal Township and South Coventry Township, Pennsylvania, received late-night reverse 911 calls to lock their doors and stay inside during the search for escaped murderer Danilo Cavalcante.
- In May 2026 in Orange County, California, during the Garden Grove chemical leak, Reverse 911 was used in the evacuation of over 44,000 residents due to the risk of explosion from a leaking tank containing the toxic chemical methyl methacrylate.

== See also ==
- 911 (emergency telephone number)
- Emergency telephone number
- Emergency notification system
- Emergency communication system
- Emergency population warning
- Emergency Alert System
- Wireless Emergency Alerts
- Cell Broadcast
- Common Alerting Protocol
- Notification system
- Public safety network
- Emergency management
- Emergency management information system
- Emergency management software
- Emergency control centre
- Office of emergency management
