= Emergency communication system =

Communication system used for emergency coordination

An emergency communication system (ECS) is any system (typically computer-based) that is organized for the primary purpose of supporting one-way and two-way communication of emergency information between individuals and groups. These systems may convey information over multiple types of devices, from signal lights to text messaging to live, streaming video, forming a unified communication system to optimize communications during emergencies. These systems are often made up of both input devices, sensors, and output/communication devices. Therefore, the origination of information can occur from a variety of sources and locations, from which the system will disseminate that information to one or more target audiences.

== Emergency communication vs. notification ==
An emergency notification system refers to a collection of methods that facilitate the one-way dissemination or broadcast of messages to one or many groups of people with the details of an occurring or pending emergency situation. Mass automated dialing services such as Cell Broadcast, Reverse 911, as well as common siren systems that are used to alert for tornadoes, tsunamis, air-raid, and other such incidents, are examples of emergency notification systems.

Emergency mass communication systems often provide or integrate those same notification services from a central source, and also include two-way communication—to facilitate communications among emergency communications staff, affected people, and first responders. Another distinguishing attribute of the term "communication" may be that it implies the ability to provide detailed and meaningful information about an evolving emergency and actions that might be taken; whereas "notification" denotes a relatively more simplistic one-time conveyance of the existence and general nature of an emergency.

Emergency individual communication refers to reports from an individual site to a central site, and may be one-way or two-way. It includes medical alarms, security alarms, panic buttons. The central site can notify others.

=== Alternate and related terms ===
Since there are a collection of related systems used in diverse settings in varying ways, there are numerous terms used by entities which have a need for emergency communications. For example, use of the terms "emergency communications" and "disaster communications" refer to the same concept.

- Alarm management
- Alerting System
- Audiovisual Public Address System
- Civil defense siren
- Common Alerting Protocol
- Disaster Communication System
- Emergency Alert
- Emergency Alert System
- Emergency Communications
- Emergency control centre
- Emergency management information system
- Emergency management software
- Emergency Notification
- Emergency population warning
- Emergency Public Warning System
- Emergency Response Software
- Emergency service
- Emergency Warning System
- Fire alarm system
- IoT Security Devices
- Mass Notification
- Medical alarm
- Network-Centric Emergency Communication
- Network-centric emergency notification
- Physical security
- Public address system
- Public Mass Notification
- Public safety network
- Public Security System
- Security alarm
- Unified Communication System
- Unified Emergency Communications
- Voice-activated radio-dispatched alarm

=== Emergency notification system ===
An emergency notification system is a method of facilitating the one-way dissemination or broadcast of messages to one or many groups of people, alerting them to a pending or existing emergency. The Emergency Notification System (ENS) was created by Dialogic Communication Corporation (DCC) in the early 1980s. DCC, including its patent portfolio, was purchased by Motorola Solutions as part of their 2018 acquisition of Airbus DS Communications.

Many local governments and organizations that hold large, public events adopt emergency notification systems to be able to notify large groups of people in the event of an emergency. For example, in 2013 the Dallas YMCA Thanksgiving "turkey trot" race, with over 40,000 participants, implemented an alert system called RedFlag.

Most major telecommunications providers offer Public Safety Answering Points (PSAPs) access to their subscriber data (in the areas serviced by the PSAP) in order to facilitate the effective use of one-way emergency notifications

==== One-click notification ====
One click notification is a method of clicking one button within a mobile app or emergency notification platform to initiate the dissemination of a message. An emergency notification system is an example of one-click multimodal notification. Organizations use a one-click notification service to trigger the sending of messages via pre-saved configurations such as selected contact groups, chosen delivery methods etc.

== Need and limitations ==
Emergencies place demands on communication processes that are often significantly different from the demands of non-emergency circumstances. Emergencies often involve escalating and evolving events that demand high performance and flexibility from the systems that provide emergency communication services. Message prioritization, automation of communication, fast message delivery, communication audit trails, and other capabilities are often required by each unique emergency situation. Inadequate emergency communications capabilities can have consequences that are inconvenient at best and disastrous at worst.

Depending on the location, time, and nature of the emergency, a large variety of limitations could present themselves when it comes to communicating details of an emergency and any resultant actions that may need to be taken to protect life and property. For example, an audio public address system might be rendered ineffective if the emergency happens to be an explosive event which renders most or all of those affected deaf. Another common example might be the limitation of a fire alarm's siren component in a deaf school. Yet another example of a limitation could be the overloading of public services (such as cellular phone networks), resulting in the delay of vital SMS messages until they are too late, such as occurred during the Boston Marathon bombing.

== Attributes ==
=== Timeliness and speed of delivery ===
Emergency systems require timely and quick dissemination in order to mitigate damage or loss of life. During the Virginia Tech massacre, about two hours had passed before the first communication (an email) was sent to staff and students. By that time, the gunman had already entered and secured a building in which he was shortly to begin his attack. It wasn't until about 20 minutes after the shootings began that a loudspeaker announcement was made for people to take cover.

=== Ease of use ===
During a crisis, the people who use an ECS need to launch their notifications and they need to be able to do so in a way that securely provides them with confidence and an intuitive interface that can be accessed from any location. An emergency communication system that's designed for non-technical users will ensure successful administration and usage; and during some life-threatening emergency situations, campus administrators must be able to trigger the alert system swiftly.

However, in order to support a robust and capable emergency communication ability, this ease of use should not preclude the use of a complex, technologically advanced system. A sufficiently advanced system is required to coordinate multiple components to act in concert, to initiate and propagate emergency communications in any manner of ways. A distinguishing factor is when such a system includes these advanced capabilities, while still being easy for the user to operate. This is important not only for effective emergency communication, but also for an organization to realize the most return on investment, as well as the user being familiar enough with its operation as to effectively operate it under stressful emergency situations, such as in an earthquake or tsunami.

=== Providing instructions ===
A clearly needed attribute of any modern emergency communication system is the ability to not only provide notification of an emergency, but to also provide clear and actionable instructions for how to respond to an emergency. In a study by the Rehabilitation Engineering Research Center for Wireless Technologies, it was revealed that regardless of the initial form of notification, a secondary form was necessary before action would be taken. This supports the important observation that providing clear and concise instructions may reduce dependency on such secondary verification; and thus, providing instructions may save lives in an urgent emergency situation.

=== Specific audiences or recipients ===
Emergencies often require delivery of different versions of the same communication at the same time. For example, in an armed hostage-taking incident, occupants of a building may need to receive instructions to lock and barricade the door until further notice, while first responders to the incident need to be aware of the lockdown instructions and be provided more specific details of the hostage-taking event to inform their actions.

Using the hostage-taking example, some of the more modern emergency communication systems state the ability to deliver a single message that provides full details to first responders, while filtering that same message to provide more limited instructions to different groups. For example, a specific message could be sent to people in a certain area, in a specific building, or even in a specific department. By using a single message that segregates information between types of users, fewer messages have to be created and sent, which can also save time.

=== Multiple communication paths/redundancy ===
There should be multiple means of delivering emergency information so that if one fails, others may get through. Also, according to the Partnership for Public Warning, research shows clearly that more than one channel of communication will be consulted by people at risk in order to confirm the need for action. The public expects to be contacted in a variety of ways. As evidenced by various historical and recent events, besides phone calls and emails, citizens also expect to be able to use and be reached via text messaging, and fax. In one exemplary incident, the 2012 Wisconsin Sikh temple shooting, barricaded victims relied on sending text messages for help, in addition to traditional phone calls. In addition, the public may look to social media as another vehicle to receive messages and check in on updates.

Additionally, the Partnership for Public Warning states, "A single warning is frequently insufficient to move people to action, especially if it cannot be confirmed by direct observation. For most people the first warning received captures their attention and triggers a search for corroboration, but cannot be relied on to elicit the desired behavior. Scientific research supports the common-sense observation that people are disinclined to risk being fooled by a single alarm that might prove false or accidental. Effective warning requires the coordinated use of multiple channels of communication."

=== Interoperability ===
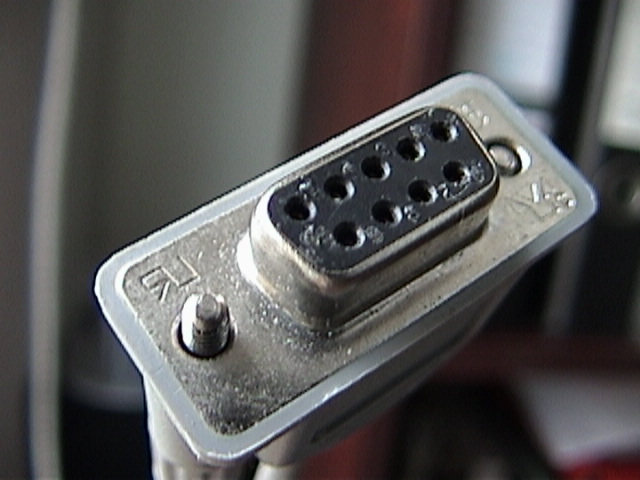
A fire control system's RS-232 data connection which an emergency communication system may interface with

To support these attributes, a "unified" emergency communication system should be able to connect to and communicate with other related systems, hence the term. According to the Partnership for Public Warning, a fundamental problem is the lack of technical and procedural interoperability among warning originators, system providers, delivery systems, and warning recipients. Originators of warnings must undertake expensive, redundant tasks using multiple, dissimilar tools and techniques to take full advantage of today's warning systems.

Also, there are multiple ways that an emergency communication system might obtain an original warning. One example of this might be the case of a building's fire control system dispatching a notice that a smoke detector has activated. A properly designed emergency communication system should be able to receive that notice and process it into a message that the building's occupants can understand and take action on in order to save life and property. Another example might be of the National Weather Service sending an EAS severe weather warning (e.g. via RSS feed or similar). Modern emergency communication systems include the capability to subscribe to such source feeds, so that those responsible for disseminating the message have the most up-to-date information.

The ability to interoperate should also consider the need to be both forward and backward compatible with older and yet-to-be-conceived technologies. Introduction of a system that cannot interoperate with previously deployed equipment creates potentially serious barriers to effective operation.

=== Affordability ===
Because of budgetary constraints, for many organizations, the affordability of an emergency communication system can be just as important as the system's capabilities and effectiveness. The purchase and installation of enough emergency communication devices to provide multiple methods of communication to many locations within an organization in order to deliver location-specific instructions and for redundancy can be very expensive. Many organizations, therefore, are looking for more economical emergency communication solutions. Overall, the more affordable it is to procure, install, and maintain an emergency communication system, the more prolific such systems may become, and the more prolific these systems are, the more likely it is that these systems will be available to aid in times of emergency in more locations. According to Federal Signal, beyond supporting emergency response, today's mass notification systems have proven to be a valuable asset for everyday, non-emergency, intra- and inter-plant communications. This has become particularly evident in the deployment of interoperable, multi-device communications technology that not only enhances overall plant communications, but provides a host of useful software-based management and administrative tools. Additionally, many of the more traditional approaches to mass notification, i.e., public address and intercom systems, e-mail, and voice and text messaging, provide everyday functionality for plant communications and process control that represents attractive potential for return on investment.

=== Product versus service ===
An emergency communication system may be composed of a product and its associated hardware and software, as owned by the entity using it (e.g., an on-site paging network), or as a service owned and provided by a third-party (e.g., a cellular carrier's SMS network). Each have their own advantages and disadvantages; however, despite perception otherwise, services have some major inherent problems when it comes to effective emergency communications. For instance, using SMS as one example, due to the architecture of cellular networks, text messaging services would not be able to handle a large volume of communications in a short period of time, making this particular type of service a potentially ineffective emergency communication method.

=== Premises based versus non-premises based ===
Premises based emergency communication systems are those which primarily or wholly exist in the same geographical or structural area as it serves, while non-premises based emergency communication systems are those which exist in a different geographical or structural area. There are advantages and disadvantages of each. Often, non-premises based systems are slower than those that are premises-based, because at the very least, the different locations need to be connected via (usually public) data networks, which may be susceptible to disruption or delay.

== History ==
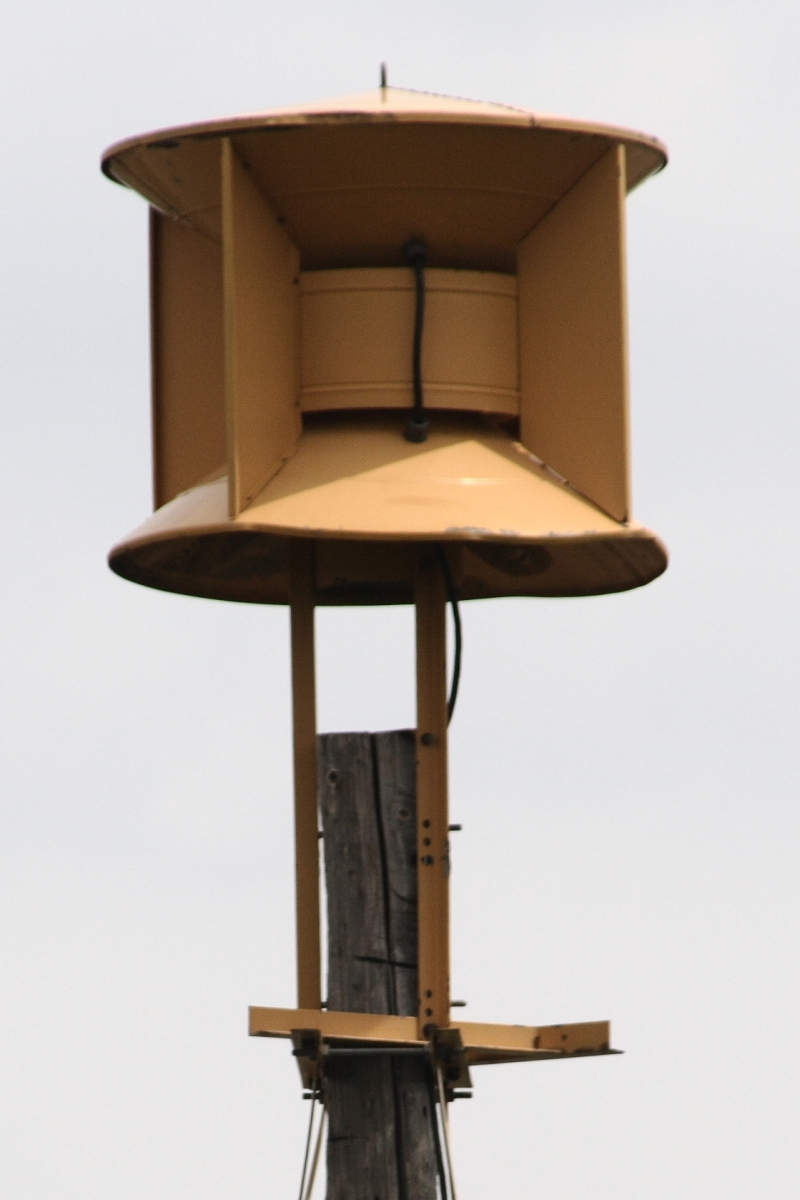
Early civil defense type of siren

With the growth of populations and the evolution of technology, the methods for communicating emergency situations have also changed, as has the definition for what might constitute an "emergency". These methods would also very likely depend on a particular region's culture and location, as well.

=== Early systems ===
In the United States' formative years, common means of emergency communications may have mostly consisted of church bells being rung or messengers on horseback. Later, as technology developed, the telegraph became a nearly instant method of communicating. From there, radio communications, telephones and sirens became commonplace.

After the surprise attack on Pearl Harbor, by the Japanese in 1941, Civil Defense sirens became popular and resulted in their widespread use in military bases and towns across America. A particular weakness of these systems is that they largely lack the ability to inform people what they should do.

Fire alarm systems were first developed around the late 1800s and other related life-safety detectors associated with those systems (e.g., duct detectors, heat detectors, etc.) were developed around the early 1900s. These constitute the first automated systems used in public and private buildings that are in normal and widespread use today. These systems, although originally designed for fire, have also been used for many other types of emergencies, sometimes effectively and sometimes not. For instance, if a fire alarm has been activated (as a general warning device) during an active shooter incident, the typical reaction to evacuate may not be the safest course of action; instead, a shelter in place action may be better. As an example, during the 2012 Aurora, Colorado shooting, a mass shooting event that happened at the Century 16 movie theater in Aurora, Colorado, the assailant began targeting victims as they attempted to exit the theater; in which case, it would have been unwise to heed the fire alarm, that was sounding, and evacuate.

=== Modern systems ===
Today, modern communication tools such as smartphones, flat-panel digital signage, GPS, and text-to-speech (among others) are changing the way in which people are notified about emergencies. With these modern tools comes the ability to provide more personalized and detailed directions to mitigate the effects of an emergency. For example, smart-phones may have geo-location abilities that can show a map of safe locations (and perhaps routing there-to) relative to those devices' specific users, triggered by a single alert. Modern implementations directed at personal devices also allow for acknowledgement of receipt. This way, emergency services can gain insight on message reception and tally users that have reached safety.

== Broadcast technologies ==
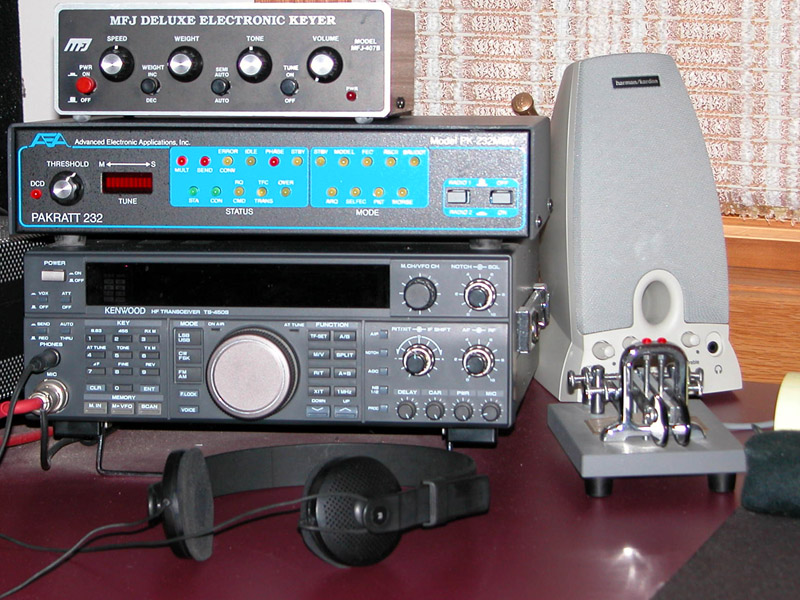
Short-wave Radio

Perhaps the oldest or most basic forms of public communication are staples such as over-the-air television, sirens, and radio. More modern components (using the same concept) might include lights and Giant Voice systems. These all have one thing in common: they broadcast indiscriminately to anyone who has the means to receive the message; whether they are simply in the immediate area or require some sort of receiving device.

Broadcast technologies use point-to-point communications methodology and may either require infrastructure or not. Examples of broadcast technologies requiring infrastructure might include such things as Reverse 911 and broadcast-affiliate networks.

=== Infrastructure-independent ===
Broadcast technologies that do not depend on man-made infrastructure to convey communication may be least susceptible to disruption during disasters and emergencies. Some examples of infrastructure-independent technologies are:

Short-wave Radio
Short-wave (or Amateur) radio is a relatively long range method of communicating using radio waves. Because of the nature of radio wave propagation, communications made via short-wave radio can be intercepted and heard by anyone with the proper equipment and knowledge. However, due to their reliance only on electrical power (which can be obtained via batteries, solar, and other alternative means) and Earth's ionosphere, they are ideal for some of the worst case emergency scenarios. One disadvantage may be that one requires training and licensing to transmit using a short-wave radio, in many countries.
Two-way Radio
Two-way radio consists of at least two devices (typically portable and hand-held) that are capable of transmitting and receiving communications to each other, using radio waves. Similar to short-wave, this type of communication is also able to be intercepted and heard by anyone with the proper equipment. However, unlike short-wave, this communication equipment is restricted by range (usually several miles, at most), but is relatively simple to operate and the main power source is usually provided by batteries. Two-way radios are in-use by many emergency responders on a daily basis, so they require minimal concentration to operate in the stress of an emergency situation, since the person operating it is already familiar with it. Additionally, many non-professionals may use unlicensed two-way radios, as is common with CB radio, Family Radio Service or PMR446.
Weather Radio
A weather radio is a device which receives normal and emergency weather broadcasts. It may automatically turn on whenever an emergency is eminent or occurring, providing an alarm as well as a description of the situation. Anyone with a weather radio device can receive these broadcasts.
Internet Based Communication
There is increasingly an opportunity to use infrastructure-independent network connection, sometimes called Network-centric emergency notification, for emergency communication. The emergence of initiatives such as Google's Project Loon offer opportunities for networked communication when infrastructure-dependent communication is hindered in emergency situations.

Each device has its own pros and cons given the emergency situation.

=== Infrastructure-dependent ===
Broadcast technologies that depend on man-made infrastructure to convey communication are susceptible to disruption if any part of that infrastructure is overloaded, damaged or otherwise destroyed. Some examples of infrastructure-dependent technologies are:

Audio Public Address Systems

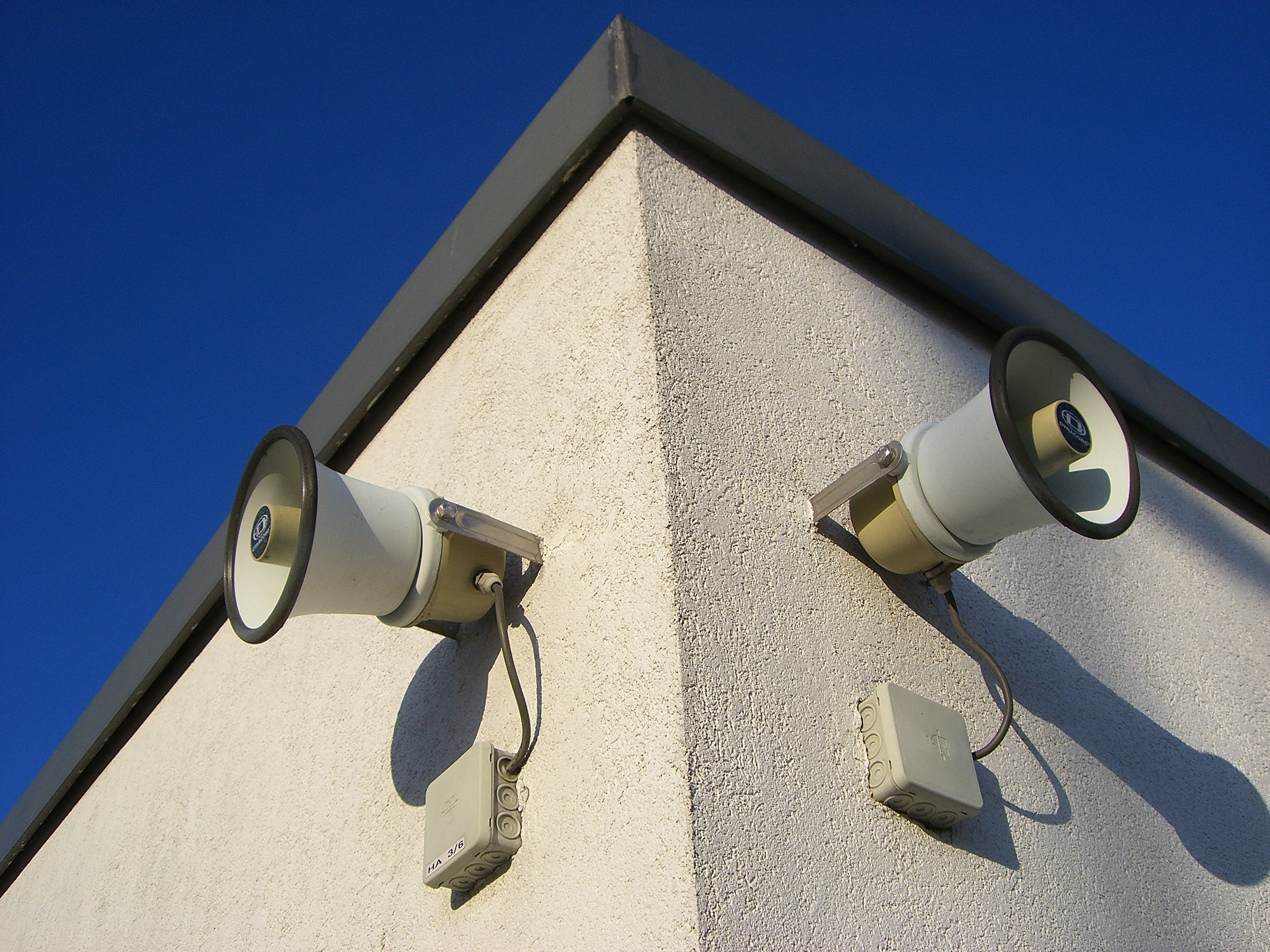
Audio public address speakers

A system which can provide audio (usually spoken language) messaging capability, usually consisting of microphone devices, wiring, and speakers installed in public areas of buildings. These systems are typically located indoors or in smaller outdoor areas with multiple speakers, due to their speakers' individual volume being too limited for large areas. Usually connected together by wiring requiring electricity, these systems may be vulnerable to electrical disruption or any other event which results in the wires being severed or disconnected.
WMT Public Address Systems
Wireless Mobile Telephony (WMT) PA Systems refers to PA paging and [intercom] systems that use any form of Wireless Mobile Telephony System such as GSM networks instead of a centralized amplifier to distribute the audio signal to paging locations across a building or campus, or other location. The GSM mobile Networks are used to provide the communication function. At the transmission end, a PSTN Telephone, mobile phone, VOIP phone or any other communication device that can access and make audio calls to a GSM based mobile SIM card can communicate with it. At the receiving end, a GSM transceiver receives these network transmissions and reproduce the analogue audio signal via a Power Amplifier and speaker. The work on this was pioneered by Stephen Robert Pearson of Lancashire, England who successfully applied for and was granted patents for the systems which incorporate control functionality in addition to the audio announcement capabilities. The use of the WMT (GSM) networks means that live announcements can be made from anywhere to anywhere in the world where there is WMT connectivity. The patents cover all forms of WMT i.e. 2G, 3G, 4G ..... xxG. A UK company called Remvox Ltd (REMote VOice eXperience) has been appointed under license to develop and manufacture products based upon this technology.
L.E.D. Electronic Signs

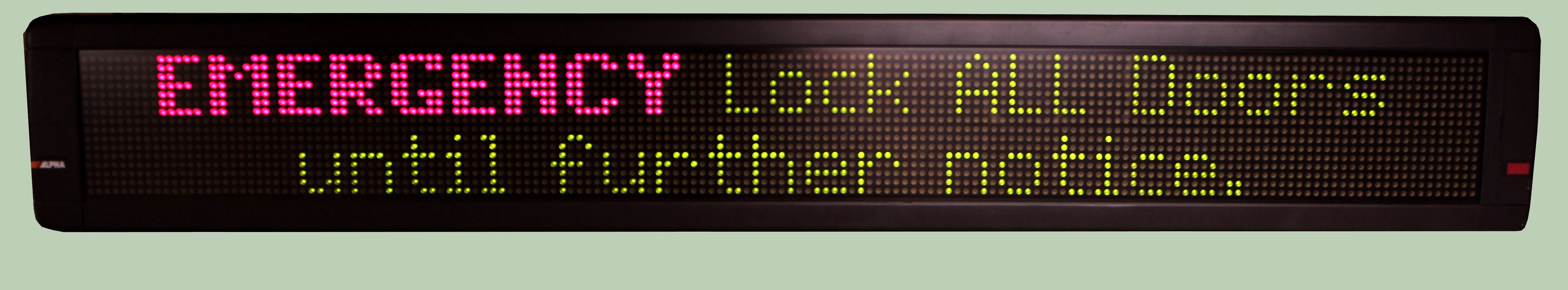
LED sign, in a wall-mounted orientation, depicting an emergency and the resulting action that should be taken to mitigate the emergency

LED electronic signs use light-emitting diodes to display messages when connected over a network to an emergency communication system. LED signs, when deployed in large numbers on a network, can be used as visual alternatives to traditional audio public address systems. LED Signs are able to communicate effectively in loud environments where audio PA systems can be ineffective. When deciding whether or not to include LED electronic signs as part of an emergency communication system, it is important to realize that a lack of hearing-impaired persons does not negate the need for visual signs. Explosions and other events can render many hearing-able people effectively deaf, necessitating the inclusion of a visual alternative to audio PA systems. LED electronic signs have multiple valuable attributes that enhance public communications:
- Some emergency communication systems can deliver, share, and prioritize the display of messages on LED signs that have been sent by multiple people and systems.
- LED signs, when connected to an emergency communication system, have the ability to project the communication in a specific direction while loud speakers generally radiate communication in many directions.
- LED signs are manufactured in a large variety of shapes and sizes, with some models designed specifically for indoor use and very bright models designed for outdoor use.
- Because LEDs consume very little electricity, power over Ethernet (PoE) and power over RS232 can be used in conjunction with UPS power located in wiring closets to keep these devices functioning for a significant period of time during a general power outage in a building.
- Like audio PA systems, visual PA systems composed of LED signs are network-attached appliances that, unlike computer screen popup messages (more information about this technology, below), text messages, phone calls, etc., represent `Always On` technologies, which can be relied on to deliver the communication in real time without the risk that the device might be off, in use, or out of power.
- LED signs are available that can display messages in a single color, red-green-yellow characters, or full color, which allows for color coding of emergency messages when desired. These types of signs can be relatively affordable compared to digital signs and are easy to install, making them a common choice for organizations wishing to use electronic forms of visual communication. Common means of connecting these devices include Ethernet or serial communication cabling.
- In combination with audio PA systems, these devices can be used to achieve compliance with the ADA requirements for equal access to communications.
Government, public and private entities may use LED electronic signs for any purpose ranging from advertising to emergency management. For emergency use of these types of signs, it is often necessary to electronically control them in a unified and coordinated manner, using one of or a mixture of specialized hardware and software. There exist at least a few commercial methods that advertise this capability, for example Siemens Sygnal, Inova Solutions, and MessageNet Connections.
Combination Audio/Visual Public Address Devices
Any device which combines the audio capability of a PA system with the visual capability of an electronic sign (usually of the L.E.D. variety). These, too, rely on infrastructure to operate.
Digital Signage

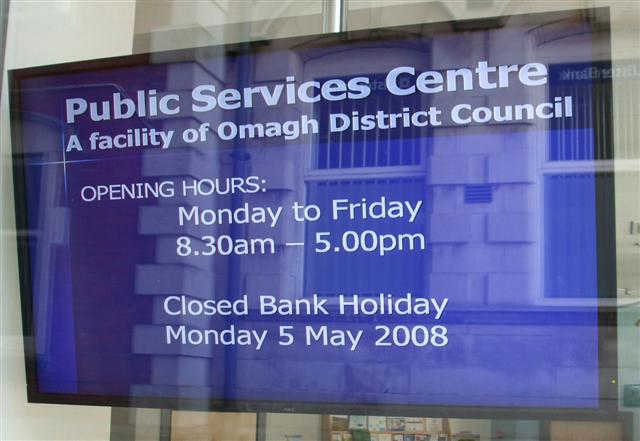
LCD digital sign

Throughout the first decade of the twenty-first century, plasma televisions and other flat-panel LCD televisions and monitors have become commonplace in businesses, hospitals, schools, post-secondary institutions, government, airports, shopping malls, and financial institutions, etc.; with that prominence, they have begun to play a major role in emergency communications. Similar to combination audio/visual PA devices, yet much more advanced, digital signage monitors are capable of displaying high-resolution videos, pictures, multimedia presentations, text and other high-definition media. Typically digital signage can provide video, audio, presentation graphics and web page content abilities that can support the communication of an emergency. In addition, the graphical multimedia capabilities of digital signage can enable emergency wayfinding or egress routing that can be customized to the event and location of the emergency and the affected people.

Digital signage is often more expensive than relatively simple LED electronic signs, which makes it more sensible to garner as much utility from it as possible for maximum return on investment. Over time, though, this technology has become more affordable, resulting in digital signage being used in more venues, usually for non-emergency purposes such as displaying news, weather, directions, etc. Other emerging uses of digital signage related to emergency communication systems include: displaying building floorplans, maps, evacuation routes, and first responder situational awareness (such as showing a firefighter where a fire has been detected).
Emergency communication systems and digital signage are integrated in many verticals including outdoor, in retail spaces, in hospitals and clinics. More recently, smart city companies are using prominent screens around the urban landscape to convey critical messages to the city's population. These emergency systems have technical integrations where the emergency message will interrupt and override any advertisements currently playing or scheduled.

Giant Voice Systems
A system focused on providing auditory messaging capability for large outdoor areas, being able to project voice and sounds over large distances, without the need for a large number of speakers. These systems are commonly used on military bases and chemical manufacturing plants, for example. These technologies allow specific instructions to be broadcast over a large area, however they may be subject to substantial echo and weather-related effects; and furthermore, environmental noise may interfere with their effectiveness. This forces unnatural speech, on the part of the warning originator, and may render the communication difficult for the listener to comprehend. This fact has prompted some to primarily rely on tones and coded signals that the audience must be familiar with in advance. Even though these can be heard over a large area, the high-powered speakers require a connection to the communication originator via some sort of infrastructure, meaning they might have a certain level of vulnerability to disruption in the collection infrastructure. The alternative to the use of Giant Voice systems is to deploy large arrays of smaller lower power speakers, this approach also allows for greater specificity of message by location. When properly synchronized these speaker arrays can deliver more comprehensible speech, however these arrays will involve larger amounts of supporting infrastructure. Siemens and Federal Signal are two of the major commercial providers of Giant Voice systems being actively deployed at military bases, government facilities and industry, currently; with Federal Signal being one of the first providers of these types of systems, after the Pearl Harbor attack.

== Communication devices ==
There are two major types of communication devices: those for individual people and those for groups of people. Public communication devices are designed to deliver a communication to more than one person as a simultaneous single process. Examples include a digital electronic sign, a loud speaker that is part of a PA system, or a large flat panel display on a wall. A private communication device is a device that is designed to deliver a communication to one person at a time through a single process. Typically, a single person is in control of such a device which is usually not shared. Examples include a cell phone, a text message on the cell phone, an email, or a message over a 2-way radio.

=== Public and shared devices ===
Public communication refers to the conveyance of messages to people, in such a way that anyone may receive the communication at nearly the same time as anyone else, typically using a common device. The most common way of facilitating public communications is by using devices that are incorporated into some public venue, such as public-address systems or digital signage. Using public devices for the purpose of public warning empowers people at risk to take actions to reduce losses from natural hazards, accidents, and acts of terrorism.

=== Private devices ===
"Private" means the delivery of messages to a specific individual, in a private manner or in such a way that even those nearby may not get the message. Common ways of facilitating private communications involve devices such as telephones or electronic mail.

==== Mobile phones ====
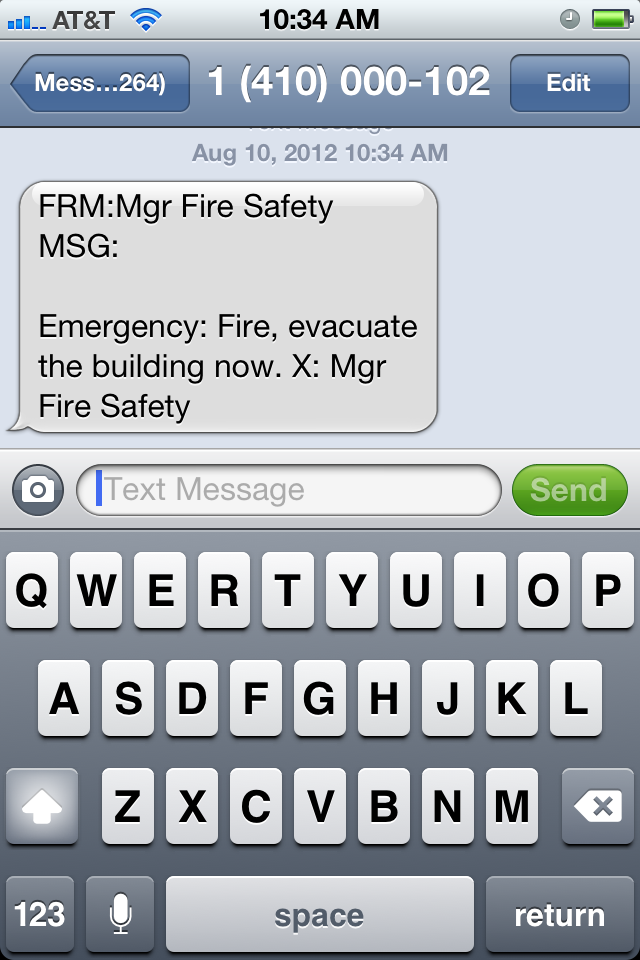
Example of an emergency SMS text message on a mobile phone. This exemplifies one potential weakness of using SMS for emergency communications, namely that messages can be forged.

Mobiles phones may be considered a private communication device, because they are usually associated with or owned by a single individual. One possible limitation of using mobile phones for emergency communications, in a bomb-threat situation, for example, might include the potential of cellular networks being disabled for fear that a bomb might be detonated using a cellular phone. They also provided wide array of apps that can help in emergency communications.

==== Line-based phones ====
These phones, in whole or in part (e.g. a cordless telephone with base station), are physically connected to and rely upon a wire (often called a landline) to operate. As with mobile phones, these are often associated with a single person, family or business. Regardless, this method may be considered private due to a single phone device's inherent weakness in reaching large numbers of people at the same time.

==== SMS/Text messaging ====
SMS text messages should be considered a type of private communication because they are directed toward a specific mobile phone number; and, thus, they are designed to reach one person at a time without the general public knowing anything about the message. A limitation in using SMS messaging for emergencies might be that it doesn't meet the needs of emergency communication: that is, it must be highly reliable, be secure, have excellent access control, and high-speed delivery.

==== Social Media – Syndicated Emergency Communications ====
- Twitter is an online social networking and micro-blogging service using SMS text messaging. While it wasn't intended or designed for high performance communication, the idea that it could be used for emergency communication certainly was not lost on the originators, who knew that the service could have wide-reaching effects early on, when the San-Francisco, California-based company used it to communicate during earthquakes.
- Facebook may have potential for emergency communication, as it has a large involved user-base.

==== Electronic mail ====
Email should be considered a type of private communication because it is sent to a specific email address, which is associated with a person. Emails can be sent to multiple people, but even this results in multiple individual copies of the email that are ultimately sent to their individual recipients.

==== Emergency-oriented instant messengers and computer screen pop-ups ====
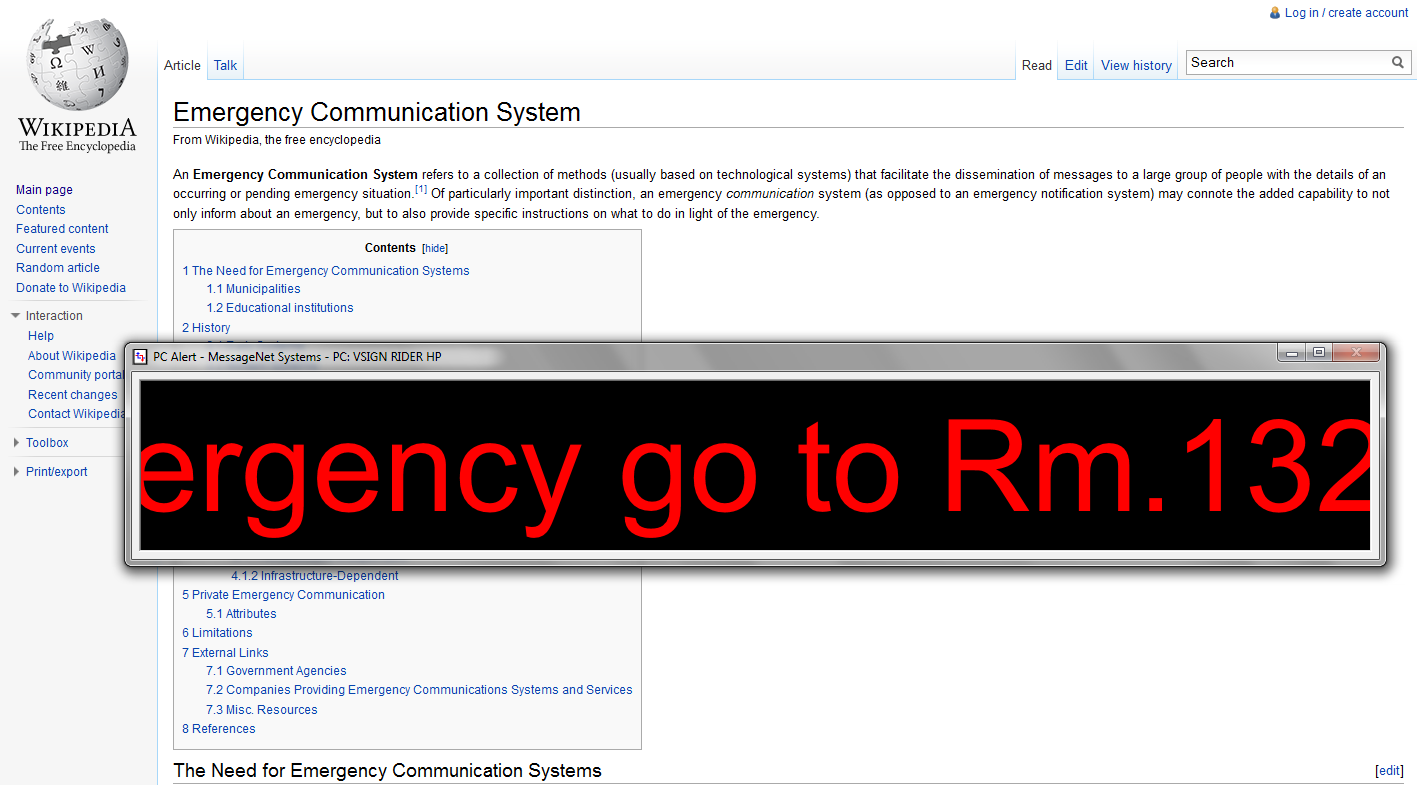
Example of an emergency-oriented scrolling instant messenger

Personal computer instant messengers have become popular and inexpensive technologies by which to deliver emergency communications to broad or specific audiences in a short period of time. With this technology, emergency communications will "pop up" on the personal computer screens as a new window that sits on top of any other window that may be open on the screen at the time. This technology uses LAN and/or WAN networks to deliver short messages, often less than about 120 characters in length, typically in real time. The speed of modern LAN and WAN technologies and the shortness of such messages makes it possible to deliver emergency messages to thousands of computer screens in less than a minute's time.

In private communications, a computer pop-up can be targeted to a specific user, i.e. one that is logged into the computer or is associated with that computer in some way. The emergency communication system should be able to define the relationship between the user and his or her computer. A potential limitation of this is that if a user is not logged in, then the operating system may not allow any messages to display.

In the case of public-oriented emergency communications, a computer pop-up ability might prove useful for public computers or interactive kiosks where more than one person might use it, or for computers with displays that are in prominent locations. In this case, the pop-up might also need to be easily read from a distance, and be able to get attention — similar to how a digital sign may be used. These might be structured as a notification window with static non-moving text, or as a window with scrolling text.

Emergency communications may require certain attributes that are not commonly found in standard instant messengers; here is a list of attributes that may prove valuable to emergency-oriented instant messengers:

- Prevents the user from killing the program, which would prevent the delivery of emergency messages.
- Delivers emergency messages in a large font that can be easily read a substantial distance from the screen.

Example of an emergency-oriented scrolling instant messenger

- Scrolls the message across the screen to attract attention and to ensure that the entire message can be displayed without any user effort. Scrolling the message may also allow for the use of a large font and readability from a distance.
- Non-chat-oriented, ensuring that the software will be set up for a large scrolling font.
- Supports many priorities for messages, ensuring that emergency messages are not lost in the crowd of common messages that may appear in the computer screen.
- Supports a non-counterfeit-able signature as part of the message to insure the recipient that the communication can be trusted and that it comes from a known authority.
- Supports both one-to-one and one to many communication.
- Emergency-oriented instant messenger requires that the sender of the message have the ability to update messages that are appearing on users PC screens without the recipient needing to take any action.
- The sender of an emergency message must have the ability to terminate the display (remove) a message from display on all of the screens that display the message by closing the window in which it is displayed.
- Supports communications to arbitrary groups of PC, by lists of PC, by lists of users, and by IP address ranges. Each of these addressability options are optimal in specific circumstances and reduce the labor of administration.

Using instant messaging for emergency communications may also present some limitations:

- If the PC is not connected to the network, it will not display the message. This means that the network is another potential point of failure.
- If the PC is logged off or if the screen saver is active and requires a password to access the screen, then conventional knowledge posits that it will prevent the delivery of the emergency message.

In addition to some well-known instant messengers, for example ICQ and AIM, a variety of specialized instant messengers exist that are intended for use in emergency communications. The commercially available products sold by RedAlert and Desktop Alert are examples of specialized instant messengers that claim to provide a relatively narrow set of message delivery capabilities within a smaller subset of an overall ECS. Other commercial offerings MessageNet Connections, React Systems, and Siemens Sygnal also provide instant messengers that are sold to be used in conjunction with other communication equipment such as phones, and digital signage as part of an integrated and whole emergency communication system.

== Case studies, failures and successes ==
=== New York City World Trade Center attack ===
During the September 11 attack in 2001, traditional telecommunications were stretched and overloaded. Phone networks along the entire East Coast were congested into uselessness. 911 operators were overwhelmed with calls and could do little more than offer encouragement because of the confusing information they were receiving. Communications between emergency services personnel were limited by a lack of interoperability between departments. Many fire-fighters died when the towers collapsed because they couldn't receive the warning that the police officers received from the New York City Police Department (NYPD) helicopters. Amateur radio played a large role in facilitating communications between the various emergency departments, which operated on different frequencies and protocols.

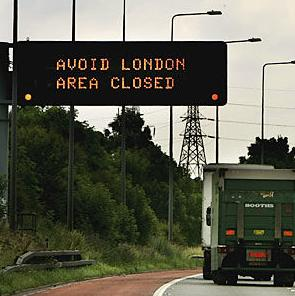
Emergency notification on motorway approaching London

=== London Underground bombings ===
On the day of the 7 July 2005 London bombings, mobile phone networks, including Vodafone, reached full capacity and were overloaded by 10:00 a.m., only an hour and ten minutes after the bombs went off. Because of an antiquated radio system, the damaged trains were unable to communicate with the Transport for London control center or emergency personnel, while senior emergency services managers, of the London Ambulance Service in particular, were forced to rely on the already overloaded mobile phone network because of the lack of digital radios. The Access Overload Control, implemented only in a 1 km area around Aldgate tube station, wasn't helpful because many officials didn't have ACCOLC-enabled mobile phones. In the aftermath, the London Assembly determined the need for a digital radio communications system in London that can operate underground.

=== 2011 Joplin, Missouri tornado ===
161 people were killed and at least 990 injured when an EF5 multiple-vortex tornado hit Joplin, Missouri. Because Joplin is located in a tornado-prone area of the country, many people considered the tornado sirens routine and ignored them. Instead, many residents waited until they received confirmation from another, non-routine, source, such as seeing the tornado, a radio or TV report, or hearing a second siren. In the aftermath, an assessment team recommended that emergency warnings take risk perception into account to convey a sense of urgency. NOAA Officials are considering ways to change the warning system to distinguish smaller tornadoes from more deadly ones.

=== Hurricane Katrina ===
When Hurricane Katrina, a Category 5 hurricane, hit New Orleans, the emergency communications systems were completely destroyed, including power stations, internet servers, mobile phone towers, and 911 services. The Federal relief workers' satellite phones weren't interoperable, even when they did work. A few AM radio stations were able to continue broadcasting throughout the storm, notably WWL Radio, which remained on the air by broadcasting from a closet. Amateur radio was instrumental in the rescue process and maintained signals when 911 communications were damaged or overloaded.

=== Virginia Tech shootings ===
The Virginia Tech shooting, which resulted in the death of 33 people, helped propel discourse for effective emergency communication systems in schools. Virginia Tech had systems already in place, including e-mail and text notifications, but lacked a cohesive plan for using them. No warnings were sent out until after the event, two and a half hours after the initial shootings. Virginia Tech has since updated its emergency communications systems, especially public ones, since students can't always check e-mail in a timely fashion and professors often request that wireless devices be turned off in class. Because the massacre occurred within a 10-minute period, other schools have also implemented new, improved emergency communications systems with an emphasis on speed of communication.

=== 2011 Tōhoku earthquake ===
The Japan Meteorological Agency's (JMA) early warning system, which uses seismometers, was able to alert millions of people across Japan about the impending earthquake via radio, mobile phone networks, including Docomo, AU, and SoftBank, and television, including both NHK channels and cable channels. The tsunami warning system alerted people shortly after, although the tsunami was larger than expected. In areas with infrastructure still intact, even though both landline and mobile phone lines were not functioning as might be expected, the Internet was still accessible. In the hardest hit areas, particularly Sendai and other areas of Miyagi, Iwate, and Fukushima Prefectures, satellite phones were often the only form of communication that functioned reliably. The following nuclear disaster at the Fukushima Daiichi Plant was rife with communications problems. No communications plan was in place, internal communications were poor, external communications were slow, and the public quickly lost confidence in TEPCO and the nuclear industry. The primary criticism was a failure of the government to release accurate information about the disaster. Calls were made for more transparency and promptness with future events.

=== 2012 Aurora, Colorado shooting ===
During the mass shooting in Aurora, Colorado, on July 20, 2012, the gunman, James Eagan Holmes, released tear gas before opening fire during a showing of The Dark Knight Rises, causing many of the moviegoers to mistake the attack for part of the film's special effects. According to preliminary reports, the suspect initially went into the theater as a patron. He then exited and propped open an emergency exit, while he went to his car to get his bulletproof vest and weapons. He then attacked after reentry through the propped-open door. In this type of situation, there could have been considerable warning. Technology exists that can warn about open doors (such as an emergency door that shouldn't normally be open), and can send clear warning and instructions to any number of devices, including a movie screen. There is also a significant opportunity to consider the use of the theater's fire alarm system. Shortly after the assailant began shooting, the building's fire alarms were sounded. The natural inclination, in response to a fire alarm, would be to evacuate the building, but in this case, the assailant was specifically targeting people who attempted to exit.

=== Hurricane Sandy ===
Hurricane Sandy hit New York City, New Jersey, and the surrounding area on October 29, 2012, destroying thousands of houses and leaving millions without electricity and thus without internet, mobile phones, or landline communications. To prepare for the hurricane, many areas provided additional emergency help lines in case 911 wasn't available, The Federal Emergency Management Agency has strengthened its ability to respond to a disaster since the communications problems during Hurricane Katrina and using Twitter in its rescue efforts, and amateur radio operators were on standby to provide emergency communications. In the aftermath, up to 25% of mobile phone towers, network providers, and television stations were powerless. Communications have been steadily improving, however, although the hardest hit areas are still experiencing serious power outages.

=== Hurricane Harvey ===
Hurricane Harvey hit the coast of Texas, causing devastation upon landfall and massive flooding in Houston after meandering through Eastern Texas over the course of four days. While organizations like the Salvation Army and American Red Cross contributed to the disaster relief process, H.E.B., a regional grocery chain, was also able to assist by using its emergency notification system to identify employees who were in need of assistance, and those available to help. H.E.B. was able to accomplish this by using its emergency notification system, AlertMedia, which it has used since 2017. H.E.B. deployed mobile kitchens and giant water coolers to the affected community in the days following the hurricane.

=== Stoneman Douglas High School Shooting ===
A gunman opened fire at Marjory Stoneman Douglas High School in Parkland, Florida, on February 14, 2018. The shooter pulled the fire alarm in order to lure students and staff members out into the hallways, which caused some confusion among students and staff members, because there had been a fire drill earlier that same day, and shortly after the shooting began, a staff member activated a code red lockdown. There was also confusion because of the contradictory instructions coming from the emergency communication system, the fire alarm instructing students to evacuate while the PA system instructed them to lock down and stay where they were. Seventeen students and staff members were killed in the shooting, and a further seventeen were injured. This incident prompted students to found Never Again MSD and demand firearm legislation from lawmakers.

== See also ==
- Civil defense siren
- Common Alerting Protocol
- Emergency control centre
- Emergency management
- Emergency management information system
- Emergency management software
- Office of emergency management
- Public safety network
