= Redcare =

Supplier of alarm signalling services for security and fire in the UK

BT Redcare was the largest supplier of alarm signalling services for security and fire in the UK. It was established over thirty years ago, and works with both the business and domestic markets.

Redcare was a widely deployed service from BT, used in the UK. Redcare signalling was fitted by alarm installation companies (“installers”), then provides a signal from a customer’s premises to an alarm receiving centre (ARC).

ARCs would monitor the signal 24 hours a day and, when necessary, alert the customer, nominated persons, police and fire services.

The BT Redcare Network has 99.997% reliability and was a dedicated network developed for security alarm and fire alarm signalling. It was supported by BT technology.

The system transmitted a continuous signal on a standard telephone line, which could also be used for voice and broadband services, to prevent alarm systems being defeated by the line being cut.

Redcare Classic worked below the voice frequency spectrum on a phone line in order to avoid interference with calls or broadband, which uses frequencies above the voice spectrum.

Other versions also used GSM (mobile) as a backup to the main phone line or functioned using either wireless (2G/3G mobile data) or IP as the primary connection all backed up by an alternative signalling path. These 2G/3G and IP offerings were marketed by Redcare under their Secure product range. Both WiFi and built-in-router direct-to-ADSL versions were available to make direct IP connections; the most basic model in the last line-up used WiFi to connect to 'any' provider, the Ultimate service used a dedicated DSL line serving only the comms unit which could only be provided by Openreach.

BT Redcare fire and security product were insurer-endorsed LPS 1277 third-party certification.

The company’s products included:

- Security
  - Redcare Classic
  - Redcare GSM Roaming
  - Redcare Secure IP
  - Redcare Secure 3
  - Redcare Secure 2
  - Redcare Secure Solo
- Fire
  - Redcare Secure Fire IP
  - Redcare Secure Fire
  - Redcare Classic Fire

On 1 February 2024, BT announced that it would close its BT Redcare operations on 1 August 2025. The end date was extended to 15th December 2025.

On 15th December 2025, BT Redcare ceased all operations.
