= Emergency management information system =

An emergency management information system (EMIS) is a computer database for disaster response that provides graphical, real-time information to responders.

== EMIS and emergencies ==
Four phases of an emergency are Readiness, Risk Mitigation, Response, and Replay. An EMIS shall enable emergency managers or any emergency stakeholder (affected civilians, police, fireman, Non Government Organizations (NGO), etc.) make their required activities in any phase of an emergency in an easy and speedy way.

=== EMIS for Readiness ===
- Preparation of contingency plans for different types of emergencies
- Creating checklists that can be easily reached by any related emergency management stakeholder
- Resource management

=== EMIS for Risk Mitigation ===
- Determine possible risk areas and/or risk types. Often supported by a geographical information system (GIS).

=== EMIS for Response ===
- Executing and tracking the contingency plan

=== EMIS for Replay ===
- Review the events of the emergency
- Various kind of reports (supported by tables, graphs, etc.)

An EMIS interacts with many other early alert systems and communicates with many legacy systems.

== See also ==
- Emergency management
- Emergency management software
- Emergency Communication System
- Logistics Support System
- Wireless Emergency Alerts
