= Driveway alarm =

Home security device

A driveway alarm is a device that is designed to detect people or vehicles entering a property via the driveway. A driveway alarm system is often integrated as a component of a system which automatically performs a task or alerts home owners of an unexpected intruder or visitor. Driveway alarms can be a vital component of security, automated lighting control, home control, energy efficiency, and other useful systems.

== Overview ==
A driveway alarm always consists of two components, a sensor and receiver. The sensor is used to detect people or vehicles on the driveway and the receiver is the device which alerts the user or owner to this detection. Wireless driveway alarms consist of three components, the sensor, receiver and a transmitter which sends the wireless alert signal to the receiver.

A driveway alarm may be connected to a burglar alarm that is used to alert the home owner or security service after it detects an intruder. Such a driveway may also trigger a security camera. Driveway alarms have found great application in domestic and commercial applications, especially in retail drive thru applications. Some of the more popular residential or commercial applications include motion-activated outdoor lighting systems, motion sensor street lamps and motion sensor lanterns.

== Sensors ==
Three types of sensors are commonly used in driveway alarm systems:

Passive infrared
Senses heat and motion. These sensors detect both vehicles and people but are prone to false alarms from animals.
Magnetic probe
Uses a magnetic coil to detect moving metal nearby. Will only alarm when a vehicle moves by and are generally more costly than the passive infrared units.
Rubber hose
When pressure is applied on top of the hose air is pushed up the hose triggering an alarm. Common in commercial applications.
Radar Sensor
Uses radio waves to accurately determine both the presence and movement of vehicles. Radar sensors are unaffected by environmental conditions like fog, wind, rain, light, humidity, and temperature.

== Wireless and wired systems ==
Driveway alarms come in both wired and wireless packages. Infrared and rubber hose systems are generally sold as wireless units while magnetic probe systems are equally available as hard wired and wireless systems. Choosing between wireless or wired systems is typically decided by the environment the unit is being installed in. The most common driveway alarms sold are wireless infrared units.

== See also ==
- Home automation
- Home security
- Motion detection
- Magnetic field sensors
- Remote camera
