= Dual loop =

Method of electrical circuit termination

Dual-loop is a method of electrical circuit termination used in electronic security applications, particularly modern intruder alarms. It is called 'dual-loop' because two circuits (alarm and anti-tamper) are combined into one using resistors. Its use became widespread in the early 21st century, replacing the basic closed-circuit system, mainly because of changes in international standards and practices.

Dual-loop allows the burglar alarm control panel to read the values of end-of-line resistors for the purpose of telling a zone's status. For example: if an alarm system's software uses 2K ohms as its non-alarm value, an inactive detector will give a reading of 2K ohms as the circuit is passing through just one resistor. When the detector goes into an active state (i.e. a door contact being opened), the circuit path has been altered and it must now pass through a second resistor wired in series with the first. This gives a reading of 4K ohms and will trigger an intruder alarm. If a resistance reading is not recognised by the system either due to short-circuit or open-circuit, an anti-tamper alarm will trigger.

Dual loop is more commonly known as Balanced EOL (End of Line) resistors. It is more secure than the former Double Pole loop, but nevertheless can be bypassed by someone with sufficient knowledge of security alarm systems.
