= Logistics Support System =

Logistics Support System (LSS) is a tool created by the Pan American Health Organization and six United Nations agencies for the purpose of facilitating the communication among humanitarian agencies, non-governmental organizations, donors, media or countries and enhancing the coordination of humanitarian supply chain. By creating matching tables to collect information from other tracking systems or by having access to already existing data in the systems' database, logistics support systems have the ability to provide decision supporting reports that show which relief supplies were received or delivered, where they have been stored, which relief supplies are requested and how useful they are at a specific moment. Sorting and classifying incoming supplies are also some functions of a logistics support system. Consequently, the function of the logistics support system enhances the proactivity of a humanitarian organization by improving problem traceability and performance monitoring and providing the advantage to timely change the plan of the supply chain without consequences.

Two modules of the logistics support system have been created: a module that operates under Windows systems and a second module that operates under a web browser. The Logistics Support System has been used in many natural disasters, including Pakistan earthquake in October 2005 and Bolivian floods in February 2006. This is being used in response to the earthquakes in Haiti and Chile 2010.
