= Emergency management software =

Emergency management software is the software used by local, state and federal emergency management personnel to deal with a wide range of disasters (including natural or human-made hazards) and can take many forms. For example, training software such as simulators are often used to help prepare first responders, word processors can keep form templates handy for printing and analytical software can be used to perform post-hoc examinations of the data captured during an incident. All of these systems are interrelated, as the results of an after-incident analysis can then be used to program training software to better prepare for a similar situation in the future. Crisis Information Management Software (CIMS) is the software found in emergency management operation centers (EOC) that supports the management of crisis information and the corresponding response by public safety agencies.

== History ==
Although such software had existed prior to 9/11, after 2001 there was a significant increase in focus on emergency management. A 2001 study by the National Institute of Justice (NIJ) compared software features from 10 vendors. In 2004, the Institute for Security Technology Studies published a report addressing the interoperability of different software, which has remained a strong focus in the development of software for the emergency management field. To support National Incident Management System implementation, the Department of Homeland Security established the National Incident Management System Support Center (NIMS SC) and the Supporting Technology Evaluation Program (STEP) in 2005. In 2007 a study similar to the National Institute of Justice report was conducted by the United States Air Force (USAF). In 2008 the United States Air Force and the University of Colorado Center for Homeland Security surveyed several hundred emergency management personnel seeking to prioritize user requirements.

== Characteristics ==
Common features of the software include Geographic Information Systems (GIS), weather and plume modeling, resource management, and Command, Control, and Communication (C3) functions.

The Federal Emergency Management Agency (FEMA) supports evaluation of software through the National Incident Management System Supporting Technology Evaluation Program (NIMS STEP). As of October 1, 2013 the FEMA P-TAC Center (formally the NIMSSC) is no longer taking applications for STEP. The National Preparedness Directorate Incident Management Systems Integration Division (NPD-IMSI) identifies criteria for this program to evaluate against. These criteria are derived primarily from the National Incident Management System. For example:

- Emergency Support Functions (ESFs) as per National Response Framework (NRF) definition
- Incident Command Functions as per National Incident Management System
  - Resource Management (preparedness, incident response, post-incident recovery, reimbursement)
- All-hazards philosophy as per the National Incident Management System
  - Specific hazards identified as per National Fire Protection Association (NFPA) 1600: Standard on Disaster / Emergency Management and Business Continuity Programs
- Standardized framework / Common Operating Picture as per National Incident Management System
- Scalability as per National Incident Management System
- Command and Management – Incident Command System (ICS) as per National Incident Management System

=== Interoperability ===
The primary focus of these standards is interoperability. A lack of interoperability was identified as a key drawback (although not limited in scope to the software) in a National Institute of Justice feature comparison report conducted in 2001. In 2004, the Federal Emergency Management Agency created the National Incident Management System which addresses interoperability by providing standardized definitions for different software to utilize. The National Incident Management System prescribes several required features that these systems must incorporate.

- American National Standards Institute InterNational Committee for Information Technology Standards (ANSI INCITS) 398-2005: Information Technology – Common Biometric Exchange Formats Framework (CBEFF)
- Institute of Electrical and Electronics Engineers (IEEE) 1512-2006: Standard for Common Incident Management Message Sets for Use by Emergency Management Centers
- National Fire Protection Association (NFPA) 1221: Standard for Installation, Maintenance, and Use of Emergency Services Communications Systems
- Organization for the Advancement of Structured Information Standards (OASIS) Common Alerting Protocol (CAP) v1.1
- Organization for the Advancement of Structured Information Standards (OASIS) Emergency Data Exchange Language (EDXL) Distribution Element v1.0

=== Crisis and emergency modeling and simulation ===
Software simulation is mainly used in the preparedness phase of the emergency management process. Simulation can be performed both to analyze possible emergency scenarios, to evaluate recovery strategies and to train institutional or private operators in better facing a crisis. Simulations can deal with weather and climate forecasting, landslides, ash clouds propagation, earthquake impact, cyber attacks, people behavior, and critical infrastructures. Precondition to simulation is modeling. Furthermore, an increasing interest is in simulating socio-technical systems where the impact of an emergency (e.g., due to a natural disaster) should be considered on both infrastructures and population. For this purpose, a novel approach is to adopt domain-specific modeling techniques in order to support representation of a crisis scenario as an executable model.

== See also ==
- Emergency management
- Emergency Communication System
- Emergency management information system (EMIS)
