= Public safety network =

Public safety agencies at various levels of government have joined together to share information and communicate when faced with public safety incidents. Interagency collaboration initiatives of this nature result in the creation of public safety networks. Public safety networks may originate at any level of government, and their user base may span a single or multiple geographies. Such a network of public safety agencies, supported by an information and communications technology infrastructure, emerges from the individual and collaborative behaviors of their member agencies.

This description focuses on public safety networks in the United States. Public safety networks have received more attention and priority as the country deals with increasing threats from terrorism and natural disasters.

Public safety networks are defined differently as seen from different perspectives. From an organizational systems perspective a public safety network is an information technology (IT) enabled collaborative, inter-organizational system. From a communications network perspective it is a wireless network used by emergency services. Both definitions are accepted within the public safety sector.

== Organizational perspective ==
Public safety organizations are limited in their ability to communicate and share information with other agencies even though they have the technology in place to do so within their own boundaries. Public safety networks help agencies realize the value of joining together to design, develop and deploy information and communications technologies to support policing, criminal justice, public safety and homeland security.

From the organizational perspective a public safety network is an interagency collaboration focused on the development and use of information and communication technologies (ICT) to support the information sharing and functional interoperability needs of public safety organizations engaged in law enforcement, criminal justice, and emergency response. As such a public safety network is a specific form of the broad class of inter-organizational information sharing systems (IOS) supporting information sharing among police and other public safety agencies.

As an IOS a public safety network has an inherent complexity due to the wide range of factors that compromise the network. The formation, structure and operation of public safety network can be affected by any number of factors including rational choices made by public safety officials, political priorities, institutional considerations and capabilities of enabling ICT. The number of potential factors lending themselves to the explanation and understanding of public safety network is considerable. Organizational perspective on public safety networks have used frameworks from rational choice, institutional, and complexity theory to understand their formation and operations.

== Communications perspective ==
From the communications perspective a public safety network is a wireless communications network used by emergency services organizations, such as police, fire and emergency medical services, to prevent or respond to incidents that harm or endanger persons or property.

Many municipalities are turning to mobile computing and other networked applications to improve the efficiency of their workforce, including public safety personnel and first responders. Consequently, public safety workers are increasingly being equipped with wireless laptops, handheld computers, and mobile video cameras to improve their efficiency, visibility, and ability to instantly collaborate with central command, coworkers and other agencies. Video surveillance cameras and unattended sensors are becoming important tools to extend the eyes and ears of public safety agencies. A pilot study along the US-Mexico border uses a wireless mesh network.

This growing need to access and share data and images has led to investment in broadband wireless mesh networks using Wi-Fi, WiMAX, and 4.9 GHz public safety radio frequencies. These networks are typically metropolitan or regional in scope, maintain connections with mobile workers, and provide low-cost bandwidth supporting real-time video, voice, and data.

== See also ==
- Interorganizational system
- Information systems
- Intergovernmental organizations
- Emergency Communication System
- IEEE 802.11
- Mesh networking
- Municipal broadband
- Public safety
- Switched mesh
- Wireless LAN
- Wireless network
- Wi-Fi
- 802.16
