= Voice-activated radio-dispatched alarm =

A voice-activated radio-dispatched alarm, or VARDA-alarm, is a type of burglar alarm that, when activated or "tripped", broadcasts the type of the alarm and the transmitter location over the local police radio frequency using a pre-recorded audio message.

In 1968, the voice-activated radio dispatched alarm (VARDA), was invented. It is a portable device that, when activated, will broadcast a message to the dispatch channel, allowing officers to immediately respond to the scene for further investigation. Although the VARDA was originally designed for law enforcement applications such as repeat break-ins, domestic violence issues and metal/equipment theft, its concept has been adapted over time to address a variety of needs in the private sector.

This type of alarm is installed for special monitoring at the location of recent burglaries. When the alarm is activated, it will set off a voice message directly over a radio frequency (generally a non-primary frequency), repeating the message several times. Example: "Burglary in progress, 231 Union Street." The message will repeat itself until the alarm is reset, usually manually.

== See also ==
- Amateur radio emergency communications
- Emergency Alert System
- Message in a bottle
- Smoke signals
