= Rhode Island Division of Commercial Licensing and Regulation =

The Division of Commercial Licensing and Regulation is the division of the Rhode Island Department of Business Regulation responsible for the licensing and regulation of real estate agents, brokers and appraisers, auto body & salvage re-builder shops, auto wrecking and salvage yards, travel agencies and travel agents, upholsterers, alarm system installers, auctioneers, liquor wholesalers, breweries, wineries, salespersons (representing wholesalers) and agents (representing manufacturers and distillers), Class G (boat/airline/railroads) license holders, line-cleaners, and mobile and manufactured homes and parks. The enforcement of unit pricing, motor fuel advertising and health club pre-opening laws are also activities of this program.

Commercial Licensing covers Alarm Licensing, Auto Body Licensing, Auto Glass Licensing, Auto Body Salvage and Rebuilders, Auto Wrecking and Salvage Yards, Auctioneer, False Advertising and Gasoline Advertising, Health Clubs, Liquor Enforcement and Compliance, Mobile/Manufactured Homes and Parks, Real Estate, Travel Agencies and Agents, Unit Pricing and Upholstery. Racing & Athletics is responsible for greyhound and horse racing and professional boxing/wrestling.

== Commercial Licensing ==
=== Alarm Licensing ===
The Section is responsible for the licensing and regulation of Burglar and Hold-up Alarm businesses and Alarm Agents. The Section coordinates and administers examinations for Alarm businesses. The Section is also empowered to investigate and adjudicate complaints against licensees to insure compliance with Rhode Island state laws and rules and regulations.

=== Auto Body Licensing ===
The Section responsible for the regulation and licensing of the auto body industry statewide. The section also investigates complaints from consumers, the insurance industry and law enforcement. The section reviews both new and renewal license applications to ensure that applicants meet all licensure requirements and that proper fees have been remitted.

=== Auto Glass Licensing ===
The Section establishes standards and procedures for the issuance of Limited Glass Licenses for motor vehicle glass installation.

=== Salvage Rebuilder Licensing ===
The Section responsible for creating standards and procedures for the issuance of a salvage rebuilder's license to licensed automobile repair shop facilities so that such facilities may repair total loss salvage vehicles. The auto salvage rebuilding regulation is intended to ensure that vehicles are reconstructed in a safe manner for the consumer/retail buyer, and to prohibit the use of stolen parts/ vehicles in the rebuilding of such vehicles.

=== Auto Wrecking and Salvage Yards ===
The Section responsible for the regulation and licensing of Auto Wrecking and Salvage Rebuilder industry statewide. The section also investigates complaints from consumers, the insurance industry and law enforcement. The section reviews both new and renewal license applications to ensure that applicants meet all licensure requirements and that proper fees have been remitted.

=== Auctioneer ===
The Section responsible for the regulation and licensing of Resident, Non-resident and Apprentice Auctioneers holding auctions within the State.

=== False Advertising and Gasoline Advertising ===
The Section responsible for the regulation of gasoline stations and advertising.

== Health Clubs ==
The Section responsible for the regulation and registration of health clubs.

=== Liquor Enforcement and Compliance ===
The Section responsible for the assessment and collection of fees specified by Rhode Island state law. The Section is also responsible for the inspection of retail and wholesale establishments and the issuance of licenses to manufacturers, wholesalers, marine vessels and railroads as well as airplanes.

The Section handles retail license appeals from actions taken by local boards. The Section also investigates complaints, licensing and examining its regulated entities.

=== Mobile/Manufactured Homes and Parks ===
The Section responsible for the licensing and regulation of mobile home parks. The Section is also empowered to investigate and adjudicate complaints from park owners, residents and citizens to insure compliance with Rhode Island state laws and rules and regulations.

=== Real Estate ===
The Section responsible for the licensing and regulation of Real Estate salespersons, brokers and appraisers. The Section coordinates and administers examinations for real estate brokers, salesperson and real estate appraisers. Additionally, the Section is responsible for issuing licenses to real estate branch offices, real estate schools and out of state land sales. The Section is also empowered to investigate and adjudicate complaints to insure license compliance with Rhode Island State laws, rules and regulations.

=== Travel Agencies and Agents ===
The Section responsible for the regulation of travel agencies and travel agents. It is also responsible for the issuing licenses and enforcing travel laws, rules and regulations. The Division also coordinates and administers examinations for travel agencies, managers and agents licenses.

=== Unit Pricing ===
The Section responsible for enforcing state laws regarding the marking of the unit price of items in retail stores.

=== Upholstery ===
The Section responsible for the licensing and regulation of Manufacturers, Supply Dealers, Repair-Renovators, Second Hand Dealers and sterilizers of bedding and upholstered furniture. Licensing ensures that all upholstered furniture and articles of bedding are properly manufactured and/or assembled and tagged, if applicable, for shipment into the state. The Section is responsible for enforcing the Uniform Registry state laws and rules and regulations.

== Racing & Athletics ==
=== Twin River ===
The Section responsible for the regulation of greyhound racing. It is also responsible for the auditing and collection of dog racing taxes and fees as stated in state law.

The Section promulgates rules and regulations for greyhound racing and pari-mutuel gambling facility operations; monitors all wagering at the greyhound racing facility; supervises the collection of state and local pari-mutuel taxes; awards racing dates for dog racing; regulates simulcast-wagering operations at licensed pari-mutuel facilities; and oversees the licensing of greyhound racing facility personnel.

=== Newport Grand ===
The Section responsible for the regulation of Newport Grand. It is also responsible for the auditing and collection of taxes and fees as mandated by state law.

The Section promulgates rules and regulations for greyhound racing and pari-mutuel facility operations; monitors all wagering at the Newport Grand facility; supervises the collection of state and local pari-mutuel taxes; regulates simulcast-wagering operations at licensed pari-mutuel facilities and oversees the licensing of Newport Grand facility personnel.

=== Professional Boxing/Wrestling ===
The Section responsible for the regulation of professional boxing, wrestling and kickboxing. It is also responsible for the collection of related taxes and fees as defined by state law.

The Section promulgates separate rules and regulations for professional boxing, wrestling, and kickboxing; monitors the conduct of all professional boxing, wrestling, and kickboxing events; audits and collects state taxes; issues licenses for professional boxing, wrestling, and kickboxing; and oversees the licensing of contestants for said events.
