= Ashley's Worlds =

New Zealand radio program

- Running time: 3-5 minutes per episode
- Country of origin: New Zealand
- Language: English
- Starring: see below
- Written by: Belinda Todd
- Produced by: Andrew Dubber and Belinda Todd
- Narrated by: Craig Parker as Ashley
- Original release: mid 1990s – late 1990s (2 years in total) (Note: Some sources say the show started on 1 January 1996 and the show ran weekly for two years.)
- No. of series: 2
- No. of episodes: 100
- Website: https://andrewdubber.com/ashleys-worlds/

Ashley's Worlds was a mid-1990s radio comedy series in 100 episodes that was broadcast on 26 radio stations and described by its creators Andrew Dubber and Belinda Todd as a "cartoon for radio".

== Plot ==
Domestic cat Ashley is transported, or "magicked", into the kingdom of Catatonia, a world completely run by anthropomorphic cats, where he is mistaken for a spy and is thrown into the dungeon of the royal castle. He escapes with the uncouth scrapper Bishop and together with their self-proclaimed hostage Tobias they seek an audience with the princess Tabitha hoping to resolve Ashley's predicament.

The four set out to seek for the ruins of Cataract. Along their journey they meet (or fight) a band of pi-rats, the giant hariry-legged giant spider Catawampus, the Felines for Freedom fighting force, Drongoon the scariest scaliest son-of-a-dragon that ever breathe fire, and Ethel the alchemist.

Finally they reach the ruins of Cataract and discover the lost city of Catlantis, a subterrainian treasure chest of ancient relics and long-forgotten magic and the inner sanctum of the immortal Eternity, the last of the ancient one.

== Cast ==
External images
- The five main characters: Tobias, Tabitha, Ashley, Bishop and The Strange Old Cat
- The main voice cast Beryl Te Wiata, Merv Smith, Belinda Todd, Craig Parker, Carl Bland, and seated David Weatherley

- Craig Parker as Ashley, a spoiled cat used to a nice patch of sunshine to sleep in and a house full of humans to pander to his every need. Prior to his transportation to Catatonia, his most unpleasant experience involved an unscheduled trip to the vet and a cold thermometer, and his most dangerous escapade was a slow flick of the tail coupled with a rather faster closing of the fridge door. In Catatonia, Ashley is a fish out of water.
- Carl Bland as Bishop, a fierce looking criminal cat eager to whip out his card which reads "Bishop the bloodthirsty: specializing in assassinations, intimidations and small wars. No job too messy." Ashley's unusual behavior first has Bishop suspect Ashley is "a crazy".
- David Weatherley as Tobias Pussinbootle the 14th, a plump and ageing "aristo-cat" of the noble Pussinbootle family.
- Belinda Todd as Tabitha, the visually impaired and self-centered princess and ruler of Catatonia whose missing father, the king, was obsessed with discovering the lost city of Cataract, built by the magically adept ancients.
- Merv Smith as The Strange Old Cat, and most additional characters.
- Beryl Te Wiata as Eternity (guest appearance)

Ilona Rodgers and Emmeline Hawthorne also made guest appearances.

== Format and style ==
The series was described by its creators Andrew Dubber and Belinda Todd as a "cartoon for radio".

Each episode of 3–5 minutes opens with a monologue musing on life as a cat, often interwoven with a recap of events in previous episodes. The comedy in both the monologue and dialogue builds on puns and some jokes having comical associations with anything related to cats or the felidae family.

== Production ==
One of my favourite things about the series was how much the parents who listened to it enjoyed it. It was one of those kids' shows where there's enough in there to keep the adults entertained, and the odd gag in there that's really only for grown-ups.

— Andrew Dubber, Dubber's blog, 2020.

The series was recorded at Progressive Studios in Anzac Ave with the assistance of Tim Gummer and Cameron Fisher. Dubber produced, edited and did the sound design using the Hanna-Barbera sound effects library. Dubber and Todd discussed characters and storylines and Todd did the writing; Creating the narrative arc, the dialogue and the comedy.

On average, each 3–5 minutes episode took around 16 hours to make. About a quarter of that was recording the dialog and the rest was digital editing.

Dubber later said that the show jumped the shark towards the end, "but they kept paying us to make it, so we kept making it after the wheels had fallen off a bit."

Producers Andrew Dubber and Belinda Todd would later produce the radio series Claybourne in 1998, which was geared towards a more mature audience.

== Distribution ==
The show was part of a syndicated compilation show for kids called Buckeroo that was broadcast on Sunday mornings on 26 radio stations in New Zealand.

In January 2005, Dubber announced on his blog "The Wireless" that he had registered Ashley's Worlds under a Creative Commons Licence (by-nc-sa 2.0) and seeded a torrent with the series, and in April 2020 he offered the complete sereies for download on his web page. Dubber called it a "survival strategy" and said in that "My theory is that the more people have copies of this stuff, the less likely it is to disappear forever. Digital archiving is about dissemination and propagating, not hoarding and hiding."

== Episodes ==
#	Monologue	Plot
1	How little Ashley asks out of life	Ashley saves a fearful feline and is magicked away after being hit on the head with a book that has a cat's paw on it.
2	Ashley's most unpleasant experiences	Ashley is chased, captured and thrown into the dungeon.
3	Getting up on the wrong side of the washing basket	Ashley meets Bishop who thinks Ashley is "a crazy". Ashley learns that he is in Kittylipvia, capitol of the kingdom of Catatonia, completely run by cats.
4	Dungeons at the best of times	The Strange Old Cat looks for his book. Ashley and Bishop escape the dungeon, leaving the castle by jumping from the top of a tower.
5	The sensation of falling	Visiting a white washed cottage with a petunia border and a heart shaped fish pond, and fainting the owner.
6	The story so far	Tobias Pussinbootle the 14th introduces himself and his pedigree. Ashley and Bishop are forced to leave the cottage. Tobias runs after them and claims to be their hostage.
7	A desperate attempt at bargaining oneself home	A mirror is magicked from Ashley's world. Unfamiliar with its function, Tobias and Bishop examines it, interacting with their own reflections.
8	What cats take for granted in life	Tobias notes how "When the going gets tough, the tough go to sleep." and takes lead to seek an audience with her catness the princess Tabitha, who may or may not see them.
9	Tomcats' confusion when confronted with the female mind	The princess Tabitha offers hot (and painful) milk and bis-cats and is presented the mirror, understanding it to be a "mewo".
10	The nine lives of cats	Tabitha identifies the sign of the cat's paw as the sign of "the ancients", the mark of the old ones. She tells of the disappearance of her father, the king. She suggests they all go to the ruins of Cataract.
11	Not choosing your travel companions	The blind princess Tabitha falls out the window, landing on a bed of irises. The Strange Old Cat finds, and casts a spell on, the mirror so he can see the traveling party.
12	How scaredy cats scarediness is rooted in imagination	A dog chases the cats up a tree, but the cats come out of the woods faster than expected.
13	How the curiosity of cats are not satisfied by schools	The princess Tabitha rings for refreshments. Bishop and Ashley forages for food.
14	The likes and don'ts of cats	Ashley fishes for fish and Bishop fishes for Ashley with assistance from a disembodied voice.
15	Cats and sleep	Sleeping while a dog finds them makes the party flee. Unable to reach consensus on which way to go, they draw whiskers to decide who gets to decide.
16	A joke on finding lost cats	Tabitha wanders off and is threatened by a dog.
17	How cats are often portrayed as villains	Bishop is challenged by cocky pi-rats at a bar and wins a map to the ruins of Cataract. And possibly a meal.
18	That Ashley only ever wanted a quiet life	The Strange Old Cat's brewing is interrupted by Tabitha's predicament. Tobias coughs up a furball.
19	Temptation	Bishop has a glass of milk and a conversation with his conscience about whether or not to share the map with the others.
20	Wanting to file a complaint	The party reunites. They examine the map and discover a spot marked with skull and crossbones.
21	Cats knowing that they're being watched	Entering the caves of Catawampus. Ashley is said to be as much help as a tongueless cat at a coat-cleaning competition. Catawampus's voice offers help in guiding the party safely through the caves.
22	Cats' ability to see in the dark	Tobias is caught in Catawampus net and they meet scary hairy-legs. They get help from an FFF representative.
23	Good causes	In the headquarters of Felines for Freedom, a fighting force against the filthy monarchy.
24	Reasons not to like caves	Reasoning with the FFF leader, Cyril, and leaving the headquarters.
25	Carefully avoiding having greatness thrown upon oneself	Escaping the caves of Catawampus.
26	Danger bringing out the best and worst in cats	Bishop rescues the entire Felines for Freedom fighting force from Catawampus and gets a kiss of death.
27	Counting close pals on the claws of one paw	Start out searching for an antidote, reaching the swing bridge and meeting Drongoon the dragon, the scariest, scaliest son-of-a-dragon that ever breathed fire.
28	Pretending to be somebody else	Tabitha is willfully taken prisoner so Tobias and Ashley can "save" her from the moggie-"dragon".
29	Doing silly things	Showdown with the dragon. Bishop is lost.
30	What cats do when they're sick	Bishop is found. Crossing the swing bridge to the unwelcoming Ye Olde Alchemy Shoppe.
31	Which cats you like and which you don't	Meeting Ethel the alchemist.
32	About kitten-stories	The party catnap. Ethel calls the Strange Old Cat and learns that Ashley, on top of moulting hair in her house, is not from their world.
33^{*}	Suspects, investigations and interrogations	Ashley tells his story to Ethel who reveals that his transportation may mean the end of catkind. A snooping Tobias is turned into a frog. Bishop wakes up.
34	Things a domestic cat don't have to deal with	The Strange Old Cat comes visiting in the form of a fly and Frog-Tobias attempts to snack him.
35	When to have suspected trouble	Ashley devices a plan to save Tobias, but The Strange Old Cat slips away.
36	The belief lucky charms	The party is tasked with unlocking the secret of the ruins of Cataract. Ashley is given the yellow rubber flip-flops of ridiculously good fortune.
37	First impression of the ruins of Cataract	Finding and entering the hidden entrance to the ruins of Cataract, going down all 1000 steps, and hearing the sound of a ghost.
38	Cat ghosts	The sound of the ghost herds the party.
39	A cat's physical reaction to fear	Bishop acting the hero. Opening a trap door of ping pong balls.
40	Distracting a cat	Ashley saves the others from distraction by producing a cat king. They hear a ticking bomb.
41	Graciously refusing gifts	The bomb goes off, revealing a labyrinth. They end up here, there, or lost.
42	The charm and repulsion of getting lost	Tabitha finds the exit. Ashley finds Tabitha.
43	Chronicling the party manifesto	Cracking a lock is easy. Opening a door, that has incorrect instructions, is not.
44	Kitten beliefs and kittenhood fantasies: Kitty-litter-fairy, Father Furball, and the Bogeycat	Opening the door to the subterrainian lost city of Catlantis and the inner sanctum of the immortal ancient one, Eternity. And the penalty for doing so (because of a missing volume in The Great Library of Supreme Knowledge).
45	Reminiscences	In a dungeon again. And together again. The relating of the animate-inanimate hypothesis of interstellar transmutation. Reading the diary of the King.
46	Who can insult your parents	Unstranging the Strange Old Cat and the realization of the true nature of the catnapper.
47	Attractions in Catlantis	A chase on a bicycle built for four. Bishop lands on the king.
48	Confessions of a failed feline felon	The king's life is saved in exchange for a purrfect tummy-rub.
49	How well things are going	Plans to use a broken transport contraption is abandoned in favor of talking winged horses: Dancer, Prancer, Lancer, Necromancer, Enhancer and Haimish. Ashley, wearing the flip-flops of good fortune, is entrusted with guarding the one and only key to Catlantis.
50	On happy endings	A triumphant return to the castle from a perilous quest. A ceremony of knighting, and Ashley returns to his world with a memento or two of his great adventure.

^{*} Episode 33 is the only episode with any acting after the end signature
