= Loach & Clarke =

Brass founding company in Birmingham, England

Loach & Clarke advert 1882

Loach & Clarke was a brass founding company based in Birmingham, England, which operated primarily during the Victorian era.

== Company history ==
The firm was established around 1790 and in its early decades appeared in trade directories as ’Loach and Clark’ situated in Little Charles Street, Birmingham. This was followed by a period of major growth and success in the mid-to-late 19th century (1850-1886). The firm was now operating out of the Tyndall Works, at 20-25 Easington Street, Birmingham, Warwickshire.It was featured in the Furniture Gazette (1 May, 1886).

Victorian mahogany bookcase fitted with locks, escutcheons and handles made by Loach & Clarke

Bookcase cabinet door handles made by Loach & Clarke. One lock faceplate is stamped with a royal crown and the letters VR

Bookcase drawer handle made by Loach & Clarke stamped 'Rd 994476' (not visible in photo)

The company continued to register designs and patents into the late Edwardian period, with trade directory listings indicating their presence into the early 20th century. This is shown by the following entry in a 1914 trades directory entry under 'Brass Founders':

Loach & Clarke, Tyndall works, 20 to 25 Essington St. Birmingham; brass founders, modellers & chasers; builders', cabinet & art metal work; patent fanlight openers, cabinet handles; bronze & ironwork to order; oxydized silver &c. &c.

== Main products ==
Loach & Clarke was a wholesaler dealing directly with the building and furniture trades. Its main products (as seen in a catalogue which probably dates up to 1886) were as follows.

1, Furniture Castors

The company invented and manufactured high-quality brass and porcelain-wheeled castors (including 'The Patent Anti-Friction Castor’) often seen on Victorian tables, seating and other furniture. The castors are marked with ‘Loach & Clarke’s Patent’.Apparently, John Loach took out a patent for castors in 1812 and another with his partner Clarke in 1841 (patent number. 8788).

2. Builder’s and Cabinet Hardware

This included decorative brass door furniture, drawer and cabinet handles, bell pulls and stamped picture moulding hooks.

3. Mechanical Hardware

Such as specialised fanlight openers and brass weight-driven pulley wheels used in long-case clocks.

4. Artistic Metalwork

Of particular note was the nickel-plated and repoussé worked cabinet ware.

An example of this repoussé work is seen with a Victorian mahogany bookcase fitted with locks, escutcheons and handles made by Loach and Clarke. On one of the locks to the upper cupboards, the faceplate is stamped with a royal crown and the letters VR, indicating it was made during the reign of Queen Victoria (1837 to 1901). Additionally, there is 'Rd 99476' stamped on of one the drawer handle back plates. The British Library Intellectual Property Department indicated this was registered as the following.

Loach and Clarke

20 Essington St.

Birmingham’

Warwick

Class 1 (metal), 7 May,1888.

This suggests that the repoussé worked metalware was made between 1888 and 1901. It was not included in the catalogue referred to in this article.
