= Laybourne =

Laybourne is a surname. Notable people with the surname include:

- Geraldine Laybourne (born 1947), American entrepreneur
- Jack Laybourne (born 1927), English footballer
- Kit Laybourne, American TV producer and educator
- Rachel Laybourne (born 1982), British volleyball player
- Roxie Collie Laybourne (1910–2003), American ornithologist from North Carolina
- Louis Laybourne Smith (1880–1965), architect and educator from South Australia

== See also ==
- Woods, Bagot, Laybourne Smith & Irwin, global architectural and consulting practice founded in Australia
- Claybourne
- Larry Bourne
- Laybourn
