= Lamborn =

Lamborn is a surname, and may refer to

- Lamborn (18th century cricketer), English cricketer of the 18th century
- Chris Lamborn (1916–1992), Australian rules footballer
- Doug Lamborn (born 1954), American politician
- Harry Lamborn (1915–1982), British politician
- Josiah Lamborn (1809–1847), American lawyer
- Kathleen Lamborn, American biostatistician
- Levi L. Lamborn (1829–1910), American doctor and politician
- Peter Spendelowe Lamborn (1722–1774), English engraver
- Tony Lamborn (born 1991), New Zealand rugby player
- W.A. Lamborn (1877–1959), British physician and entomologist

== Given names ==
- Peter Lamborn Wilson (born 1945), American anarchist

== Other ==
- Mount Lamborn, a mountain in Colorado

== See also ==
- Lambourn (surname)
- Lambourn, a village in Berkshire, England
- Lambourne, a village in Essex, England
