= Buzzer =

Audio signalling device

A buzzer or beeper is an audio signaling device, which may be mechanical, electromechanical, or piezoelectric (piezo for short). Typical uses of buzzers and beepers include alarm devices, timers, train and confirmation of user input such as a mouse click or keystroke.

== History ==
=== Electromechanical ===
The electric buzzer was invented in 1831 by Joseph Henry. They were mainly used in early doorbells until they were phased out in the early 1930s in favor of musical chimes, which had a softer tone.

=== Piezoelectric ===
Piezoelectric buzzers, or piezo buzzers, as they are sometimes called, were invented by Japanese manufacturers and fitted into a wide array of products during the 1970s to 1980s. This advancement mainly came about because of cooperative efforts by Japanese manufacturing companies. In 1951, they established the Barium Titanate Application Research Committee, which allowed the companies to be "competitively cooperative" and bring about several piezoelectric innovations and inventions.

== Types ==
=== Electromechanical ===
Early devices were based on an electromechanical system identical to an electric bell without the metal gong. Similarly, a relay may be connected to interrupt its own actuating current, causing the contacts to buzz (the contacts buzz at line frequency if powered by alternating current) Often these units were anchored to a wall or ceiling to use it as a sounding board. The word "buzzer" comes from the rasping noise that electromechanical buzzers made.

=== Mechanical ===
A joy buzzer is an example of a purely mechanical buzzer and they require drivers. Other examples of them are doorbells.

=== Piezoelectric ===
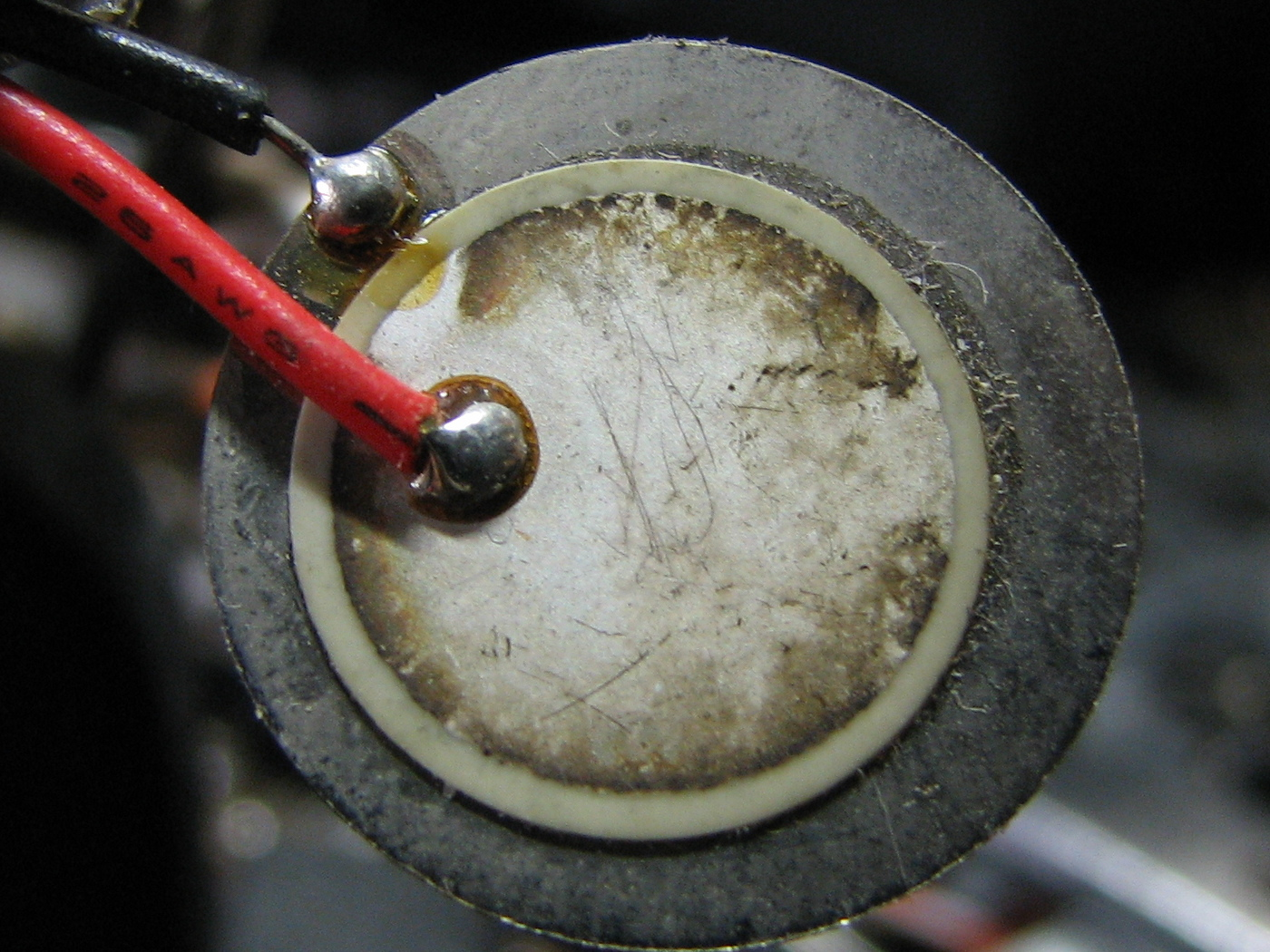
Piezoelectric disk beeper

A piezoelectric element may be driven by an oscillating electronic circuit or other audio signal source, driven with a piezoelectric audio amplifier. Sounds commonly used to indicate that a button has been pressed are a click, a ring or a beep.

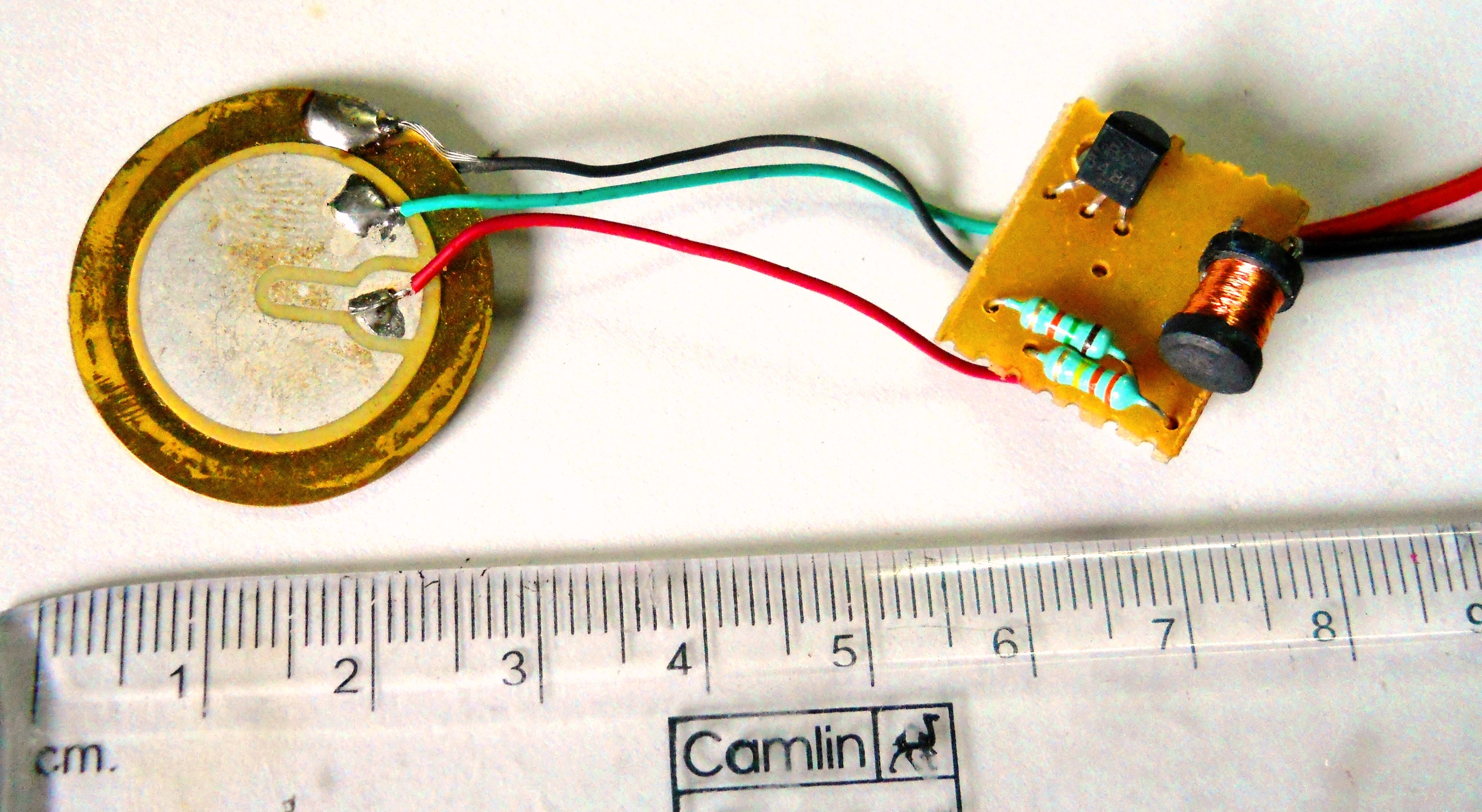
Interior of a readymade loudspeaker, showing a piezoelectric-disk-beeper (With 3 electrodes ... including 1 feedback-electrode ( the central, small electrode joined with red wire in this photo), and an oscillator to self-drive the buzzer.

A piezoelectric buzzer/beeper also depends on acoustic cavity resonance or Helmholtz resonance to produce an audible beep.

== Modern applications ==
While technological advancements have caused buzzers to be impractical and undesirable, there are still instances in which buzzers and similar circuits may be used. Present day applications include:

- Novelty uses
- Judging panels
- Educational purposes
- Annunciator panels
- Electronic metronomes
- Game show lock-out device
- Microwave ovens and other household appliances
- Sporting events such as basketball games
- Electrical alarms
- Joy buzzer (mechanical buzzer used for pranks)

== See also ==
- Alarm clock
- Alarm management
- Klaxon
- Vibrator (mechanical)
- Joy buzzers
- UVB-76, a Russian radio station that emits a characteristic buzzing sound and is also called The Buzzer.
