= Lambourn (surname) =

Lambourn is a surname. Notable people with the surname include:

- Arthur Lambourn (1910–1999), New Zealand rugby player
- George Lambourn (1900–1977), British artist
- Elizabeth Lambourn (born 1966), British historian

== See also ==
- Lamborn, a surname
- Laybourn
