= Electric bell =

Mechanical bell that functions by means of an electromagnet

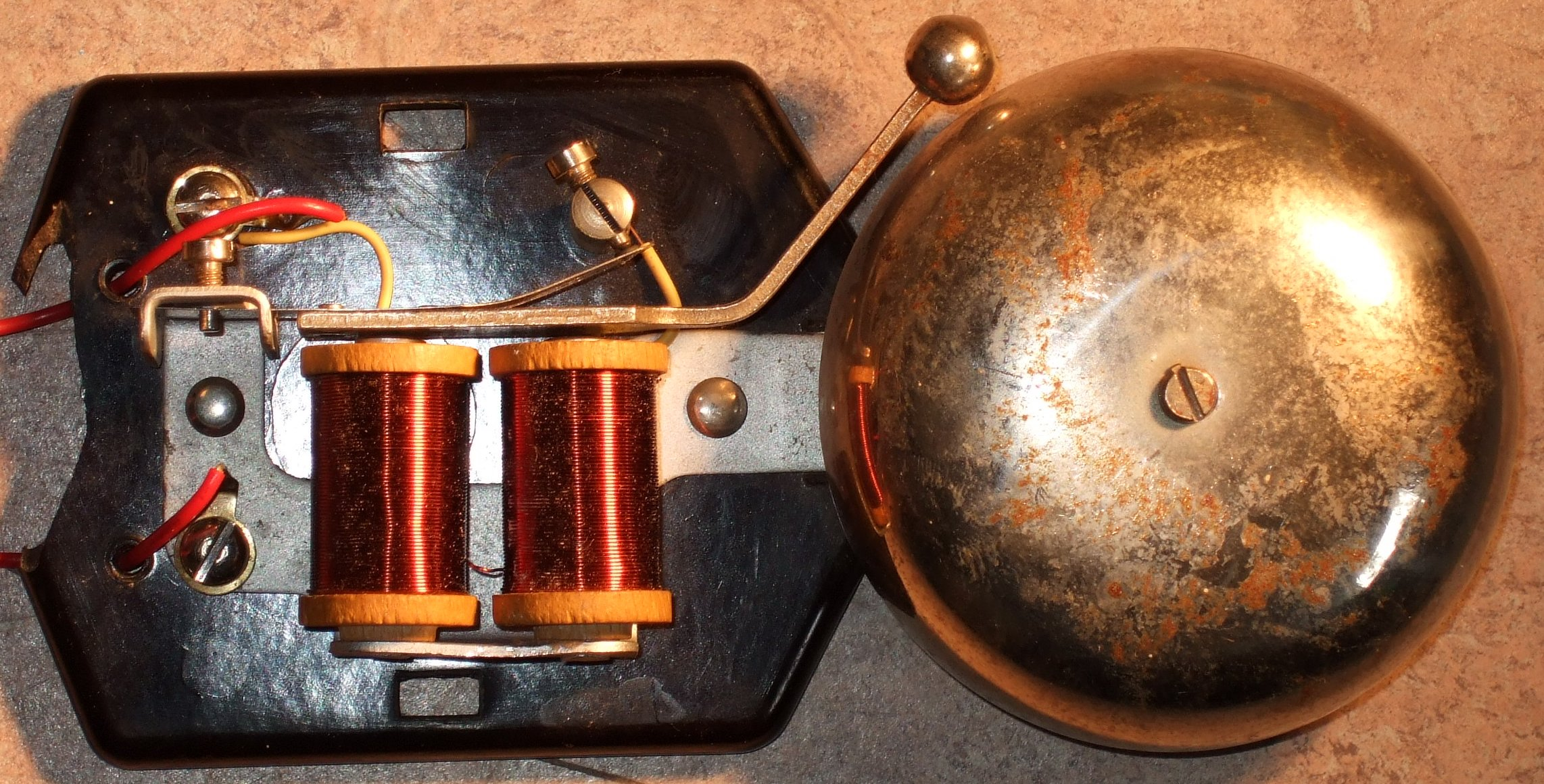
Older electric doorbell

An electric bell is a mechanical or electronic bell that functions by means of an electromagnet. When an electric current is applied, it produces a repetitive buzzing, clanging or ringing sound. Electromechanical bells have been widely used at railroad crossings, in telephones, fire and burglar alarms, as school bells, doorbells, and alarms in industrial areas, since the late 1800s, but they are now being widely replaced with electronic sounders. An electric bell consists of one or more electromagnets, made of a coil of insulated wire around an iron bar, which attract an iron strip armature with a clapper.

== Types ==
=== Interrupter bells ===
==== How they work ====
How an interrupter-type electric bell works.

The most widely used form is the interrupter bell, which is a mechanical bell that produces a continuous sound when current is applied. See animation, above. The bell or gong (B), which is often in the shape of a cup or half-sphere, is struck by a spring-loaded arm (A) with a metal ball on the end called a clapper, actuated by an electromagnet (E). In its rest position the clapper is held away from the bell a short distance by its springy arm. When the switch (K) is closed, an electric current passes from the battery (U) through the winding of the electromagnet. It creates a magnetic field that attracts the iron arm of the clapper, pulling it over to give the bell a tap. This opens a pair of electrical contacts (T) attached to the clapper arm, interrupting the current to the electromagnet. The magnetic field of the electromagnet collapses, and the clapper springs away from the bell. This closes the contacts again, allowing the current to flow to the electromagnet again, so the magnet pulls the clapper over to strike the bell again. This cycle repeats rapidly, many times per second, resulting in a continuous ringing.

The tone of the sound generated depends on the shape and size of the bell or gong resonator. Where several bells are installed together, they may be given distinctive rings by using different size or shapes of gong, even though the strike mechanisms are identical.

Another type, the single-stroke bell, has no interrupting contacts. The hammer strikes the gong once each time the circuit is closed. These are used to signal brief notifications, such as a shop door opening for a customer, rather than continuous warnings.

=== Buzzers ===
An electric buzzer uses a similar mechanism to an interrupter bell, but without the resonant bell. They are quieter than bells, but adequate for a warning tone over a small distance, such as across a desktop.

A buzzer or beeper is an audio signalling device, which may be mechanical, electromechanical, or piezoelectric. Typical uses of buzzers and beepers include alarm devices, timers and confirmation of user input such as a mouse click or keystroke.

With the development of low cost electronics from the 1970s onwards, most buzzers have now been replaced by electronic 'sounders'. These replace the electromechanical striker of a bell with an electronic oscillator and a loudspeaker, often a piezoelectric transducer.

=== Single-stroke bells ===
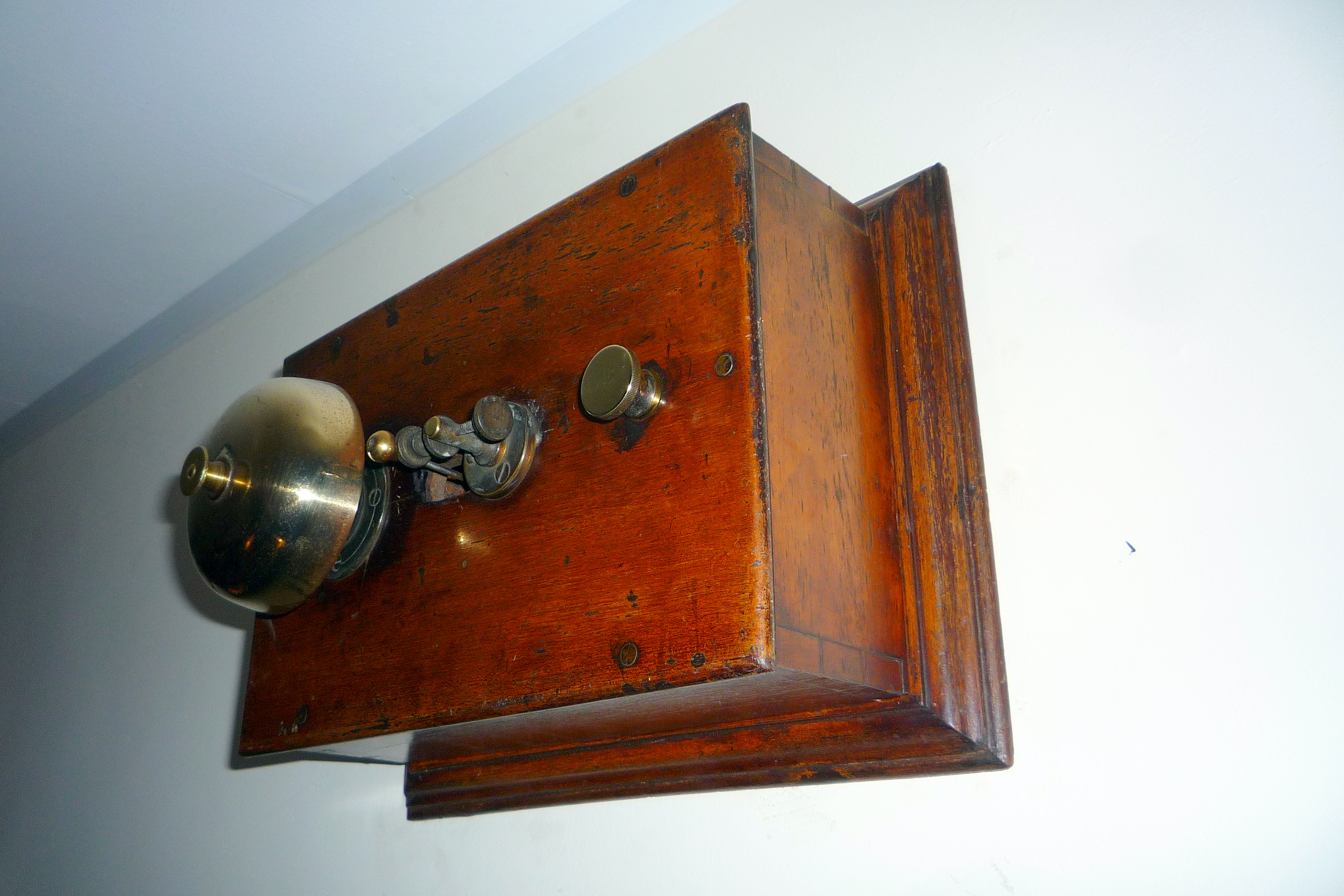
Single-stroke bell for railway signalling

The first commercial electric bells were used for railway signalling, between signal boxes. Complex bell codes were used to indicate the types of train passing between signal boxes, and the destinations to which they should be routed.

These were single-stroke bells: applying current to an electromagnet pulled the bell's clapper against the bell or gong and gave one chime. The bell did not ring continuously, but only with a single ring, until current was applied again. To sustain the tone, these bells were usually much larger than are used today with interrupter bells. Bells, gongs and spiral chimes could all be used, giving a distinct tone for each instrument.

A simple development of the single-stroke bell was the sprung bell. This had previously been used, mechanically actuated, for servant-call bells in large houses. Instead of working a clapper, the electromagnet shook the whole bell, which was mounted on a flexible spiral spring. The inertia of the heavy bell on the light spring would continue ringing for some seconds after the stroke. Although the sound would rapidly die away, the visible trembling of the bell could indicate which bell had been rung, amongst a panel of several.

=== Telephones ===
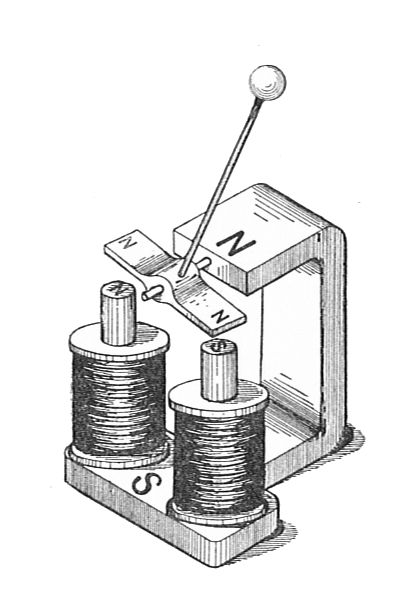
Polarised bell, circa 1903

Landline telephone bells were powered by 60 to 500 volts RMS at between 16 and 25 Hertz AC. and a different design, the polarised bell, was used. These have an armature containing a permanent magnet, so that this is alternately attracted and repelled by each half-phase and different polarity of the supply. In practice, the armature is arranged symmetrically with two poles of opposite polarity facing each end of the coil, so that each may be attracted in turn. No contact breaker is required, so such bells are reliable for long service. In some countries, notably the UK, the clapper struck two different sized bells in turn giving a very distinctive ring.

=== Fire alarms ===
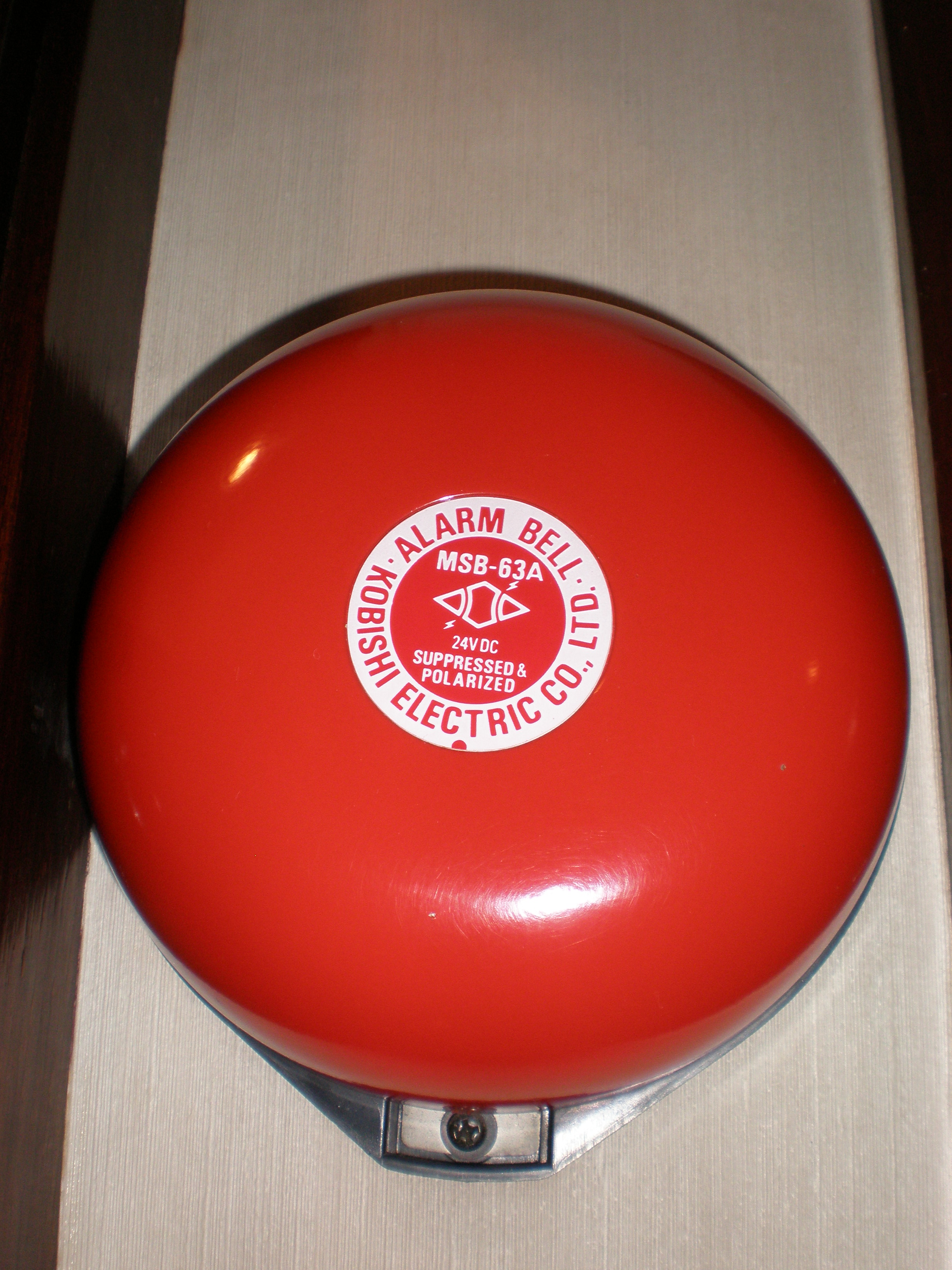
Fire alarm bell

Fire alarm bells are divided into two categories: vibrating, and single-stroke. On a vibrating bell, the bell will ring continuously until the power is cut off. When power is supplied to a single-stroke bell, the bell will ring once and then stop. It will not ring again until power is turned off and on again. These were frequently used with coded pull stations.

== Power sources ==
Electric bells are typically designed to operate on low voltages of from 5 to 24 V AC or DC. Before widespread distribution of electric power, bells were necessarily powered by batteries, either wet-cell or dry-cell type. Bells used in early telephone systems derived current by a magneto generator cranked by the subscriber. In residential applications, a small bell-ringing transformer is usually used to power the doorbell circuit. So that bell circuits can be made with low-cost wiring methods, bell signal circuits are limited in voltage and power rating. Bells for industrial purposes may operate on other, higher, AC or DC voltages to match plant voltages or available standby battery systems.

== History ==
The interrupter bell evolved from various oscillating electromechanical mechanisms which were devised following the invention of the electromagnet by William Sturgeon in 1823. One of the first was the oscillating electric wire invented by James Marsh in 1824. This consisted of a wire pendulum dipping into a mercury trough, suspended between the poles of an electromagnet. When current was passed through the wire, the force of the magnet made the wire swing sideways, out of the mercury, which broke the current to the magnet, so the wire fell back. The modern electric bell mechanism had its origin in vibrating "contact breaker" or interrupter mechanisms devised to break the primary current in induction coils. Vibrating "hammer" interrupters were invented by Johann Philipp Wagner (1839) and Christian Ernst Neeff (1847), and was developed into a buzzer by Froment (1847). John Mirand around 1850 added a clapper and gong to make the standard electric bell for use as a telegraph sounder. Other types were invented around that time by Siemens and Halske and by Lippens. The polarized (permanent magnet) bell used in telephones, which appeared about 1860, had its beginning in the polarized relay and telegraph developed by Werner Siemens around 1850.

== See also ==
- Doorbell
- Oxford Electric Bell, which operates electrostatically rather than by an electromagnet
