= Laybourn =

Laybourn is a surname. Notable people with the surname include:

- Keith Laybourn (born 1946), British historian
- Thomas Laybourn (born 1977), Danish badminton player

== See also ==
- Lambourn (surname)
- Laybourne
