= Claybourne =

1998 radio drama

- Running time: 5-6 minutes per episode
- Country of origin: New Zealand
- Language: English
- Home station: Newstalk ZB
- Starring: see below
- Written by: Jim McLarty & William Davis
- Produced by: Andrew Dubber and Belinda Todd
- Original release: 1 June 1998 – unknown
- No. of episodes: 96
- Website: http://claybourne.bandcamp.com/

Claybourne is a 1998 radio drama in 96 episodes with elements of science fiction, supernatural thriller, and soap opera. The series was produced by Andrew Dubber and Belinda Todd of Pronoun Productions after the production of Ashley's Worlds.

== Plot ==
After a breakup, American Thompson is on holiday from his work for Koestler Industries and arrives in Claybourne. He starts to investigate the death of behavioural psychologist Helen, working for Koestler on a secret project with commercial as well as military applications. He teams up with Mata and Mike of the Te Whenua o Te Irirangi-people and local bartender Karen.

The show has many Māori characters and a focus on Māori culture.

== Cast ==
- Jim McLarty as Thompson, an American on vacation on New Zealand
- William Davis as Mata, a Māori kaumātua (elected tribal leader)
- Angela Bloomfield as Karen, a local bartender
- Bruce Allpress as Frank
- Melwayne Edwards as Mike
- Brenda Kendall as Edith
- Robert Pollock as Phillip

== Production ==
The sound was designed by Andrew Dubber and Sean James Donnelly. The music was performed by Victoria Kelly and Joost Langeveld.

The show was designed with a story arc spanning a full year in mind, but was cancelled after six months and ending the show on a cliffhanger. In 2006, Dubber sketched what he remembered of how the writers and producers imagined it may have continued.

== First airing and later releases ==
The show aired on the radio station Newstalk ZB four days a week just after 15:00 and with a repeat at 01:00.

The show was one of the most popular spoken word programmes on mp3.com. Andrew Dubber later released the work under a Creative Commons license (CC BY-NC) on Bandcamp as free download around 2006. In 2006 it was also distributed as podcast by the Podcast Network.

== Awards ==
Claybourne won "Best Dramatic Production of the Year" at the 1999 New Zealand Radio Awards.

== Later comments ==
In her book Revolution in the Echo Chamber: Audio Drama's Past, Present and Future (2019), Leslie Grace McMurtry wrote that Claybourne had many compelling elements: the strong pull of seriality and episodes available in digestible chunks, a seemingly infinite series of cliffhangers, centripetal storytelling, bookending litany, compelling characters, and accessibility.

She noted that the series had "taken on an afterlife probably not envisaged by its creators", and wrote that it was a testament to the series' quality that, though intended for a New Zealand audience, it had become globally engrossing.
