= Bell pull =

Embroidered textile used to ring servant bells

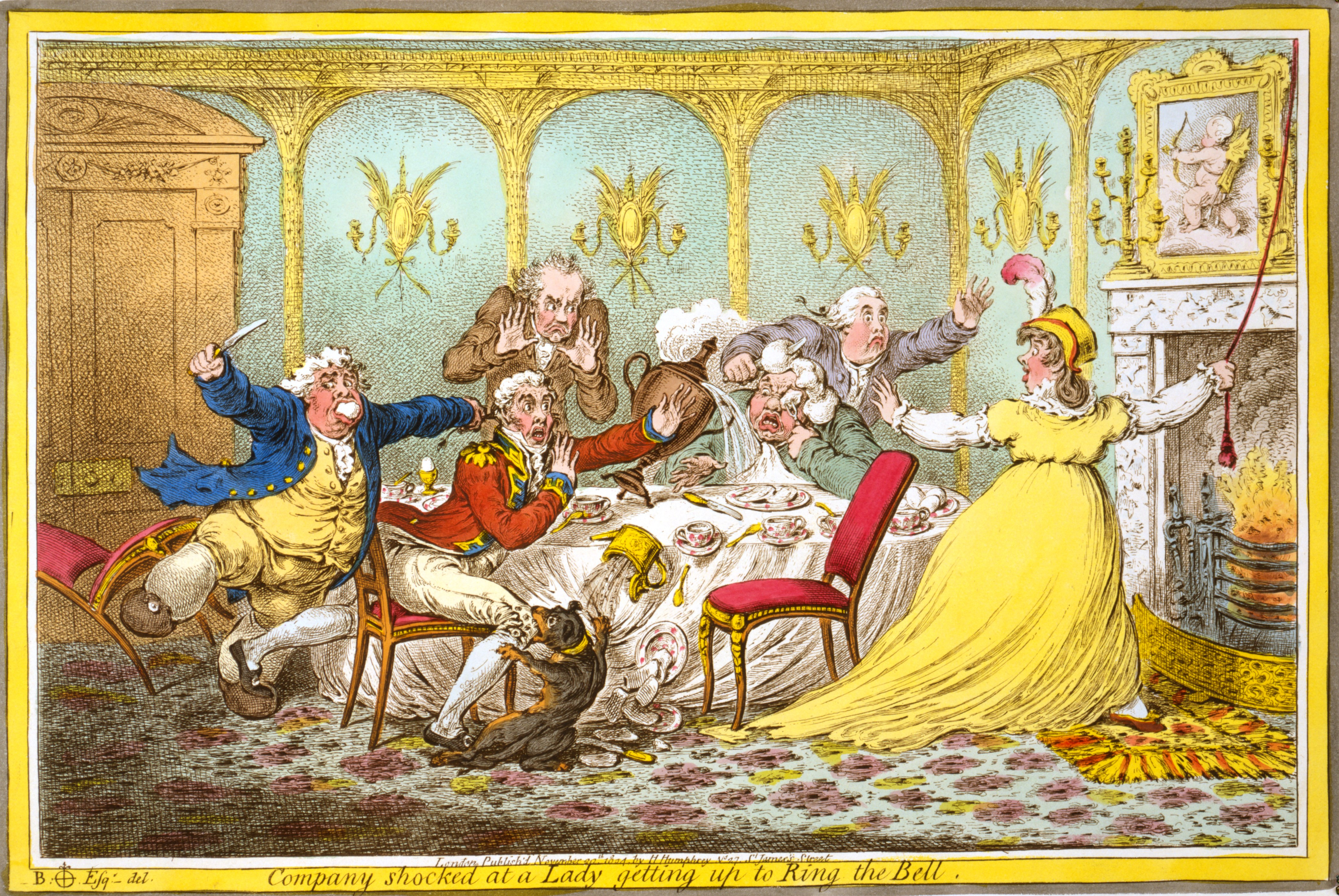
In Company shocked at a Lady getting up to Ring the Bell (1805), James Gillray caricatured suitors eager to save a lady the effort of using a bell pull.

A bell pull is a woven textile, pull cord, handle, knob, or other object that connects with a bell or bell wire, and which rings a service bell when pulled. Bell pulls may be used to summon workers in homes of people who employ butlers, housemaids, nannies or other domestic workers, and often have a tassel at the bottom. The bell pull is one element of a complex interior mechanical network which, in Victorian times, typically involved a range of bell pulls in different rooms, connected to a central bank of labelled bells in a room where servants would wait to be summoned.

== Central bell panel ==
In the 19th century, some hotels also had such panels, with a bell for each room, as parts of centralized bell systems.

== Transport ==
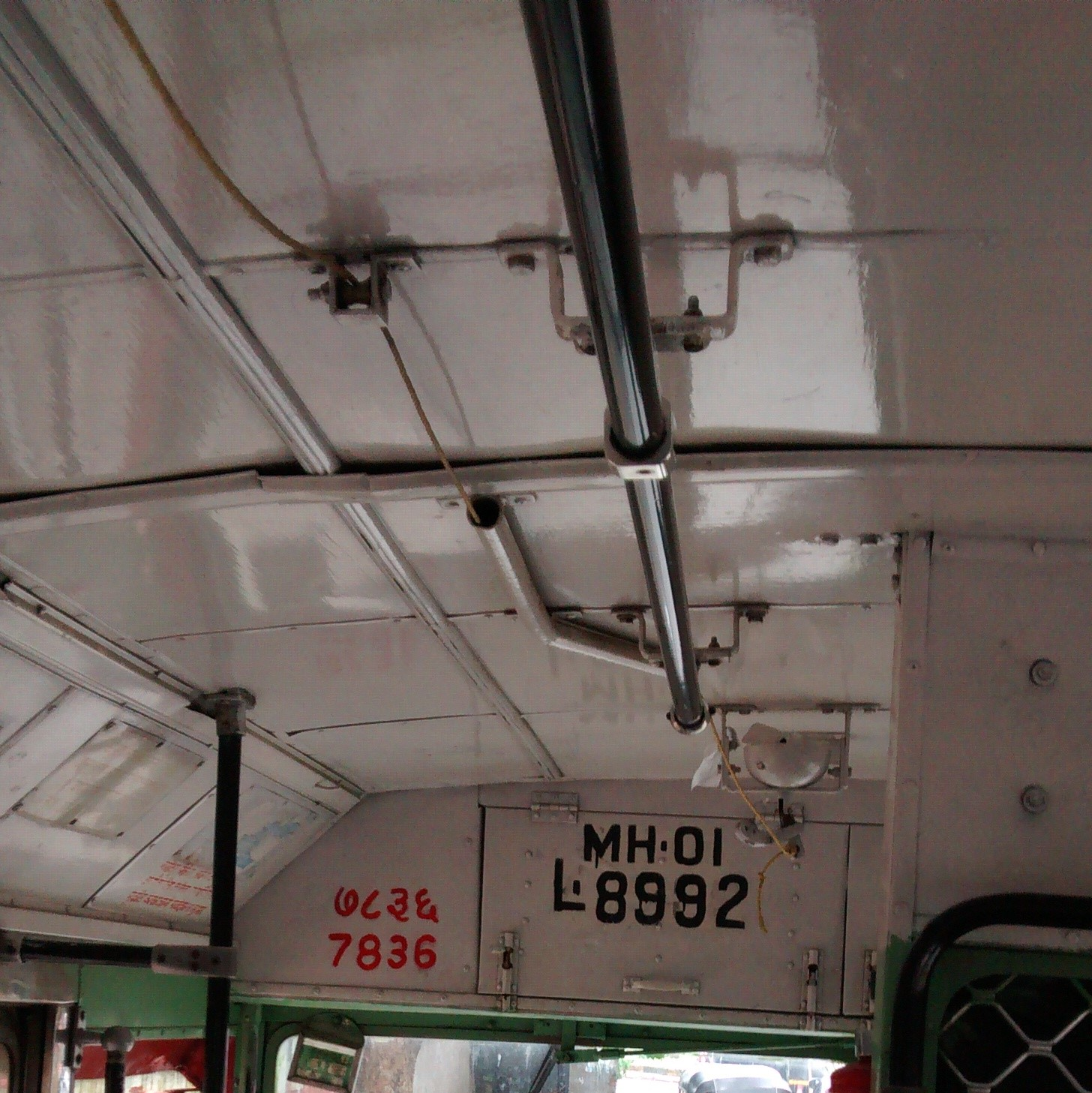
A bell pull and bell in a bus in Mumbai, India

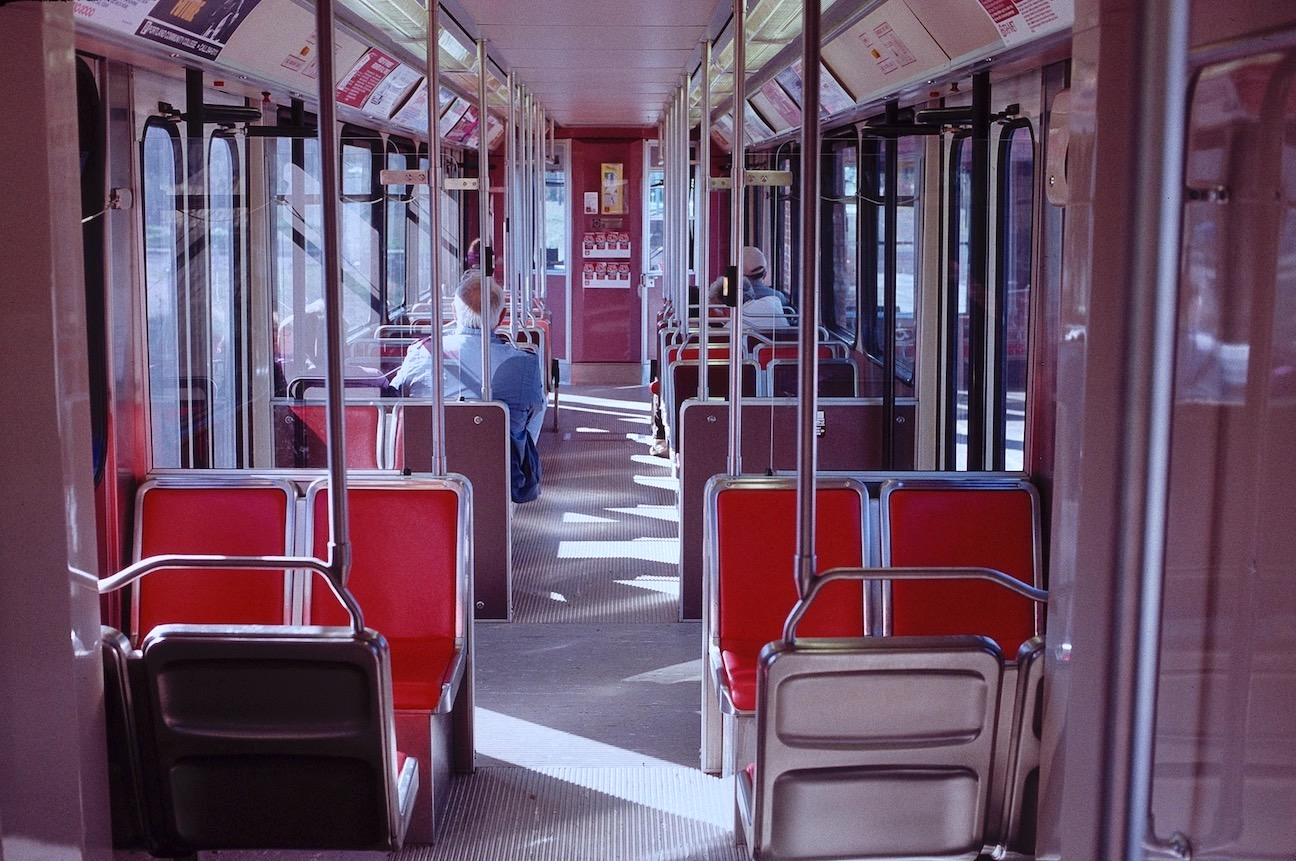
A tram in Portland, Oregon including bell pull cords near the top of each window.

A bell pull is widely used in public transport buses and trams to signal the driver to halt at the next stop.

== See also ==
- Door bell
- Door knocker
