= Peter Spendelowe Lamborn =

English painter

Peter Spendelowe Lamborn (1722 – 5 November 1774) was an English engraver and miniature painter.

== Biography ==
Lamborn was born at Cambridge in 1722, the son of John Lamborn (died 1763), a watchmaker, and Elizabeth Susanna Spendelowe, his second wife. Lamborn came to London and studied engraving under Isaac Basire, but returned to practice at Cambridge, where he obtained some note as an engraver. He also showed considerable skill as a miniature painter.

Lamborn was a member of the Incorporated Society of Artists, and signed their declaration roll in 1765; he exhibited with them first in 1764, sending a miniature of a lady and a drawing of the church at St Neots, Huntingdonshire. He continued to exhibit there annually up to his death. His architectural drawings were much esteemed. Lamborn engraved two sets of views of university buildings in Cambridge, a large view of the Angel Hill at Bury St Edmunds (after John Kendall), and some landscapes after Poelenburg and Jan Both.

He also engraved the plates to Sandby's edition of 'Juvenal' (1763), Bentham's 'History of Ely Cathedral (1771), and Martyn and Lettice's 'Antiquities of Herculaneum' (1773).

He etched a few portraits, including those of Samuel Johnson (drawn from life), Oliver Cromwell (from the picture by Samuel Cooper at Sidney Sussex College), John Ives, F.R.S. Thomas Martin, F.R.S., Dr. Richard Walker, vice-master of Trinity College (after D. Heins), The Rev. Charles Barnwell, and Richard Penderell; impressions of all these etchings are in the print room at the British Museum. On 6 January 1762 Lamborn married Mary, daughter of Hitch Wale, and granddaughter Wale of Little Shelford, Cambridgeshire, by whom he had three sons and one daughter. The latter married James was mother of James Lamborn Cock, music publisher, of New Bond Street, London. Lamborn died at Cambridge on 5 November 1774. A miniature portrait of him is in the possession of Mrs. Lamborn Cock.

== Gallery ==
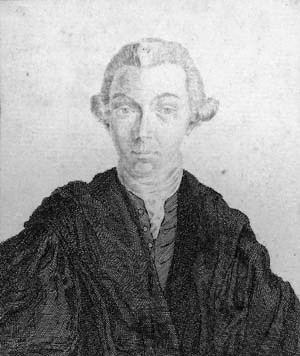
John Ives

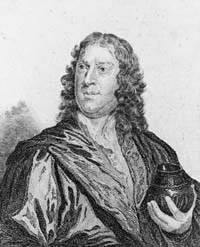
Thomas Martin of Palgrave

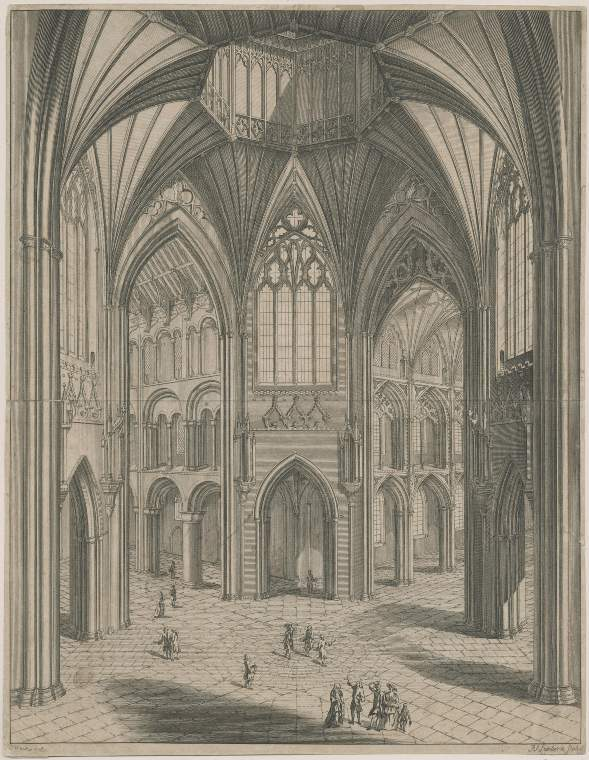
