= Servant bell =

Bell used to call a servant's attention

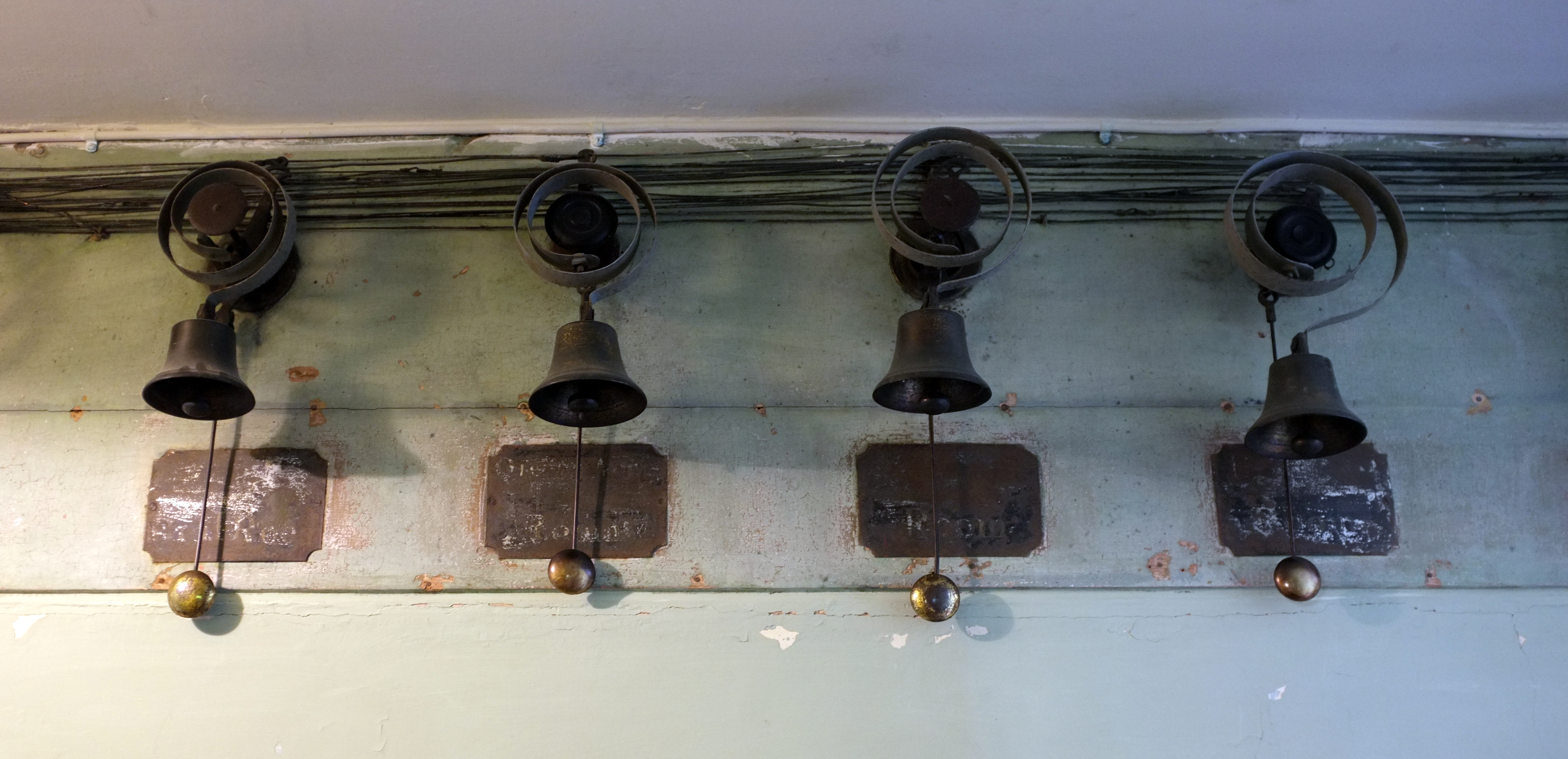
Staff call bells

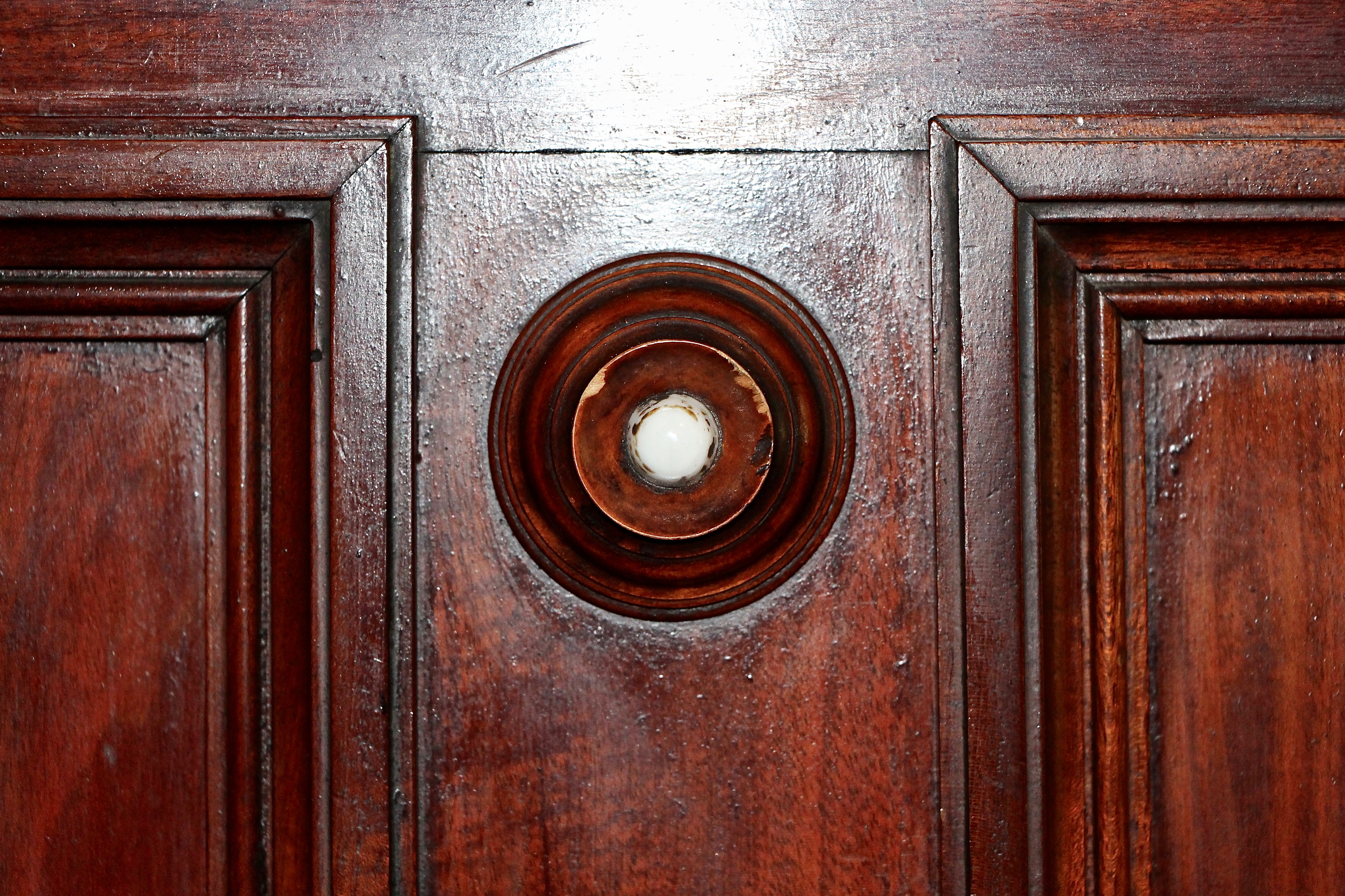
Button for electric bell to call the servants, George Stephen House in Montreal, Canada

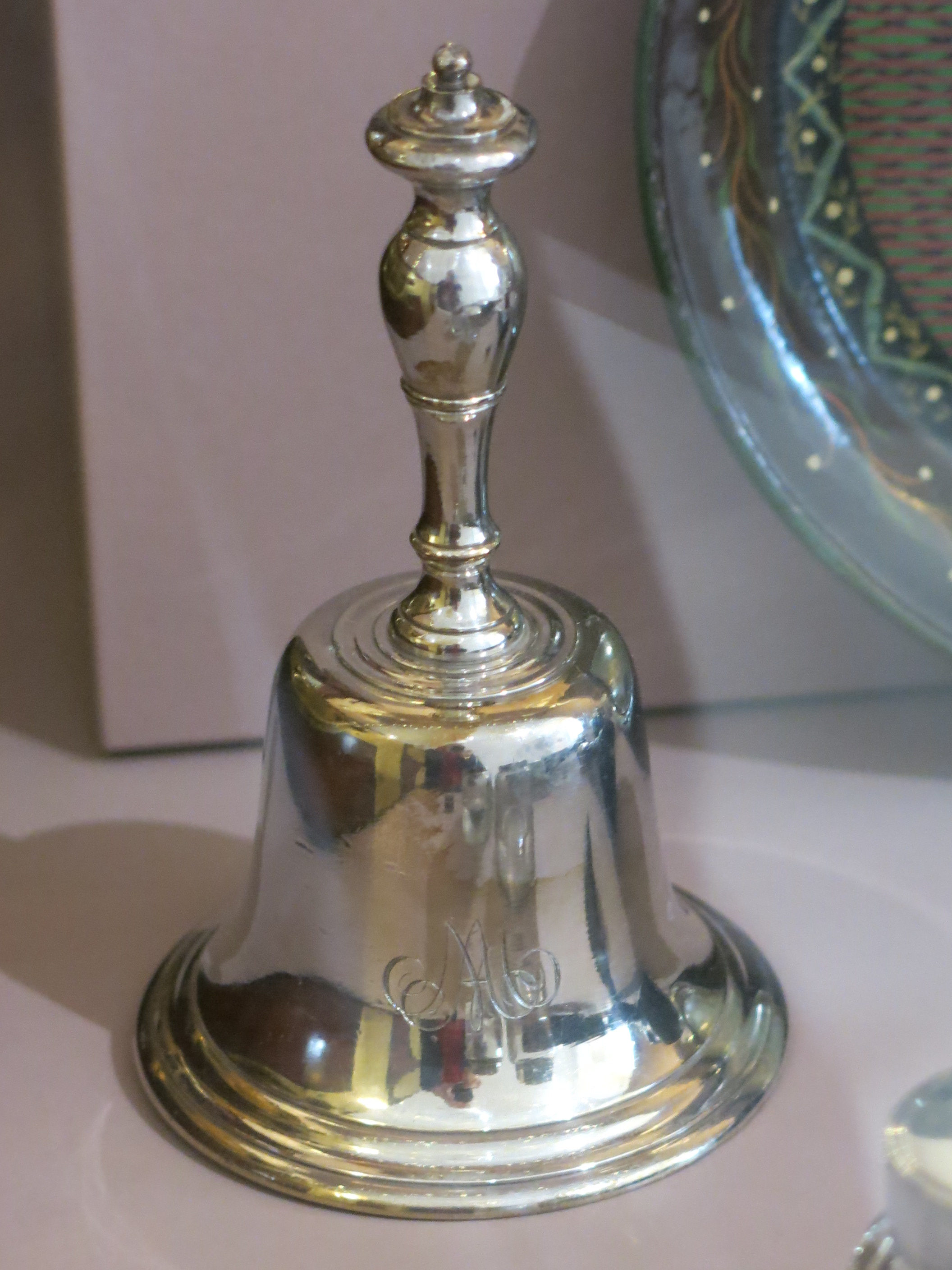
The service bell of the queen of France, Marie-Antoinette. The hand bell's small dimensions (height: 11cm) make it easy to grasp.

A servant bell, or service bell, is a bell used to call the attention of a servant.

== History ==
In the 18th century, British country houses grew in size and servants were moved to separate service wings. Servants were further moved out of sight with the use of service tunnels, basement walkways and utility rooms. With this followed a need for new methods of communication. By the 19th century these were a common feature of middle class homes.

Rooms were fitted with bell pulls or levers which a household member could pull. A system of wires connected the pull to a bell in a service area, in stairwells or outside servants' rooms.

The bells were fixed to a board and each bell was individually labelled so servants could see which room requested service.

Bells hung from coiled springs. A pendulum connected to the spring continued to swing so servants could see which bell had rung. Bells could be of different sizes and emit different sounds, allowing servants to audibly identify specific bells.

How quickly the bells were answered was often a matter of complaint.

Marilyn Palmer commented: "No object is more evocative of historic household communication than the sprung bell."

== See also ==
- Call bell
