= Abraxas (disambiguation) =

Abraxas is a deity in the Gnostic faith.

Abraxas, or the variant form Abrasax may also refer to:

== Music ==
- Abraxas (ballet), a ballet with music by Werner Egk
- Abraxas (band), a Czech rock band
- Abraxas (album), a 1970 album by Santana
- Abraxas: Book of Angels Volume 19, a 2013 album by Shanir Ezra Blumenkranz
- "Abraxas", a song on the Dopethrone album Demonsmoke (2009)
- "Abraxas", a song on the Therion album Lemuria (2004)
- "Abraxas", an instrumental number on the Clarence Clemons album Peacemaker (1995)

== Fiction ==
- Abraxas (comics), a fictional cosmic entity in the Marvel Comics' universe
- Abraxas, Guardian of the Universe, a science fiction movie
- Abraxas Malfoy, paternal grandfather of Draco Malfoy in the Harry Potter book series
- Abraxas, a character in the 1992 Discworld novel Small Gods
- Abraxas, the symbolic godhead in the novel Demian by Hermann Hesse
- Abraxas Conjecture, a mathematical proof in the Foundation series.

== Other uses ==
- Abraxas (computer virus), a computer virus discovered in 1993
- Abraxas (market), a darknet market
- Abraxas (moth), a genus
- Kulturhaus Abraxas, in Augsburg, Germany
- Les Espaces d'Abraxas, a housing development in France
- Abraxas Foundation, a think tank founded by Boyd Rice

== See also ==
- Abraxis (disambiguation)
