= Abraxas interpunctata =

Scientific classification
- Domain: Eukaryota
- Kingdom: Animalia
- Phylum: Arthropoda
- Class: Insecta
- Order: Lepidoptera
- Family: Geometridae
- Genus: Abraxas
- Species: A. interpunctata

Binomial name
- Abraxas interpunctata Warren, 1905

Species of moth

Abraxas interpunctata is a species of moth belonging to the family Geometridae. It was described by Warren in 1905. It is known from Sula Island.
