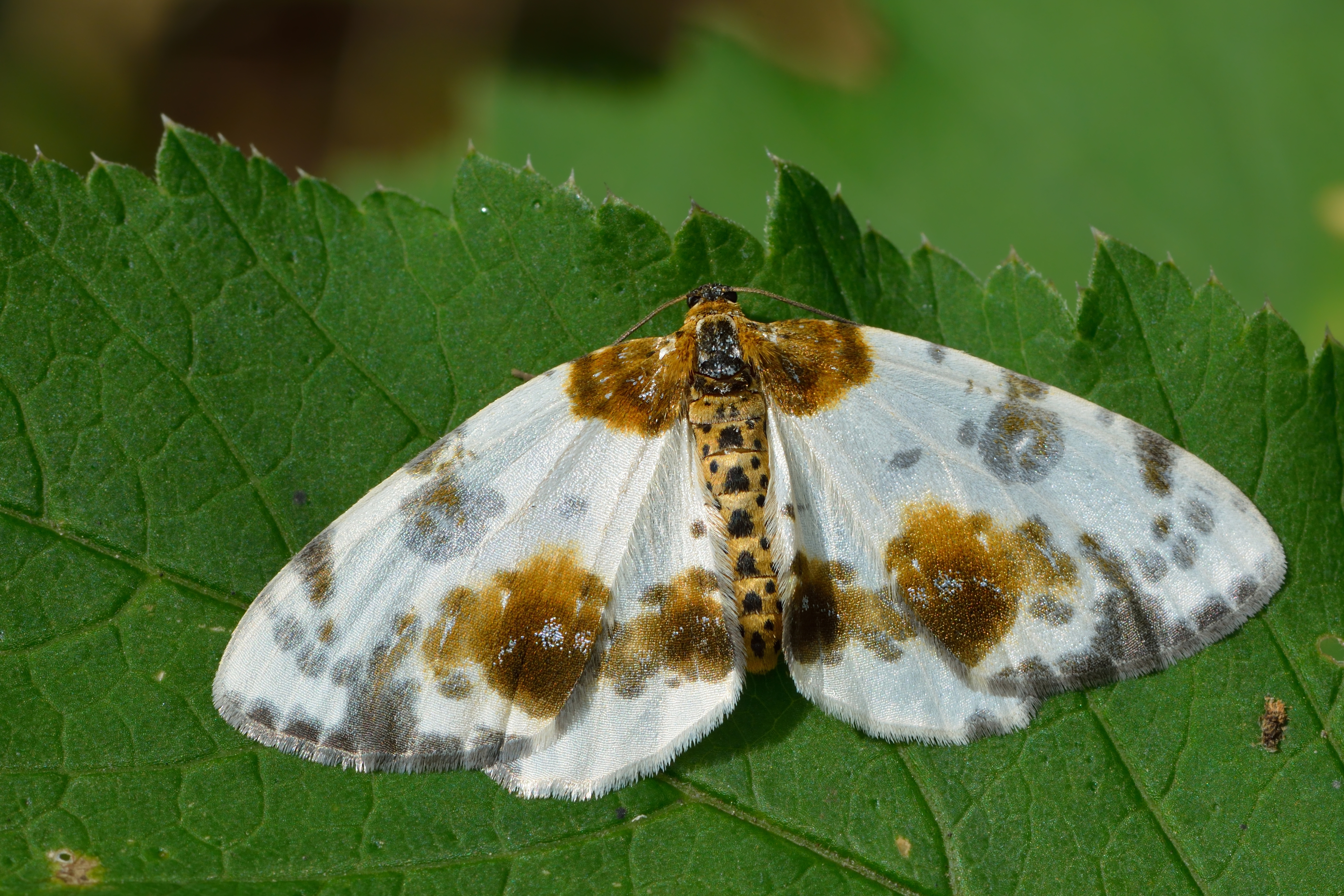

Scientific classification
- Kingdom: Animalia
- Phylum: Arthropoda
- Class: Insecta
- Order: Lepidoptera
- Family: Geometridae
- Genus: Abraxas
- Species: A. sylvata

Binomial name
- Abraxas sylvata (Scopoli, 1763)

Synonyms
- Phalaena sylvata Scopoli, 1763; Phalaena ulmata Fabricius, 1775; Calospilos sylvata Scopoli, 1763

= Abraxas sylvata =

Clouded magpie

Species of moth

Abraxas sylvata, the clouded magpie, is a Palearctic moth of the family Geometridae that was named by Giovanni Antonio Scopoli in 1763.

== Description ==
This moth is mostly white with brownish patches across all of the wings. There are small areas of pale gray on the forewings and hindwings. They resemble bird droppings while resting on the upper surface of leaves. The wingspan is 38 mm. to 48 mm. The wings are thinly scaled and partially transparent, with a white ground colour. The forewings are yellow-brown at the base and have a large, yellow and black spot at the dorsal edge, otherwise scattered, light grey spots, some of which form a cross-band in the outer part of the wing. The hindwings have a yellow and black spot at the edge of the inner edge, otherwise scattered, light grey spots. The larva has black and yellow longitudinal stripes.

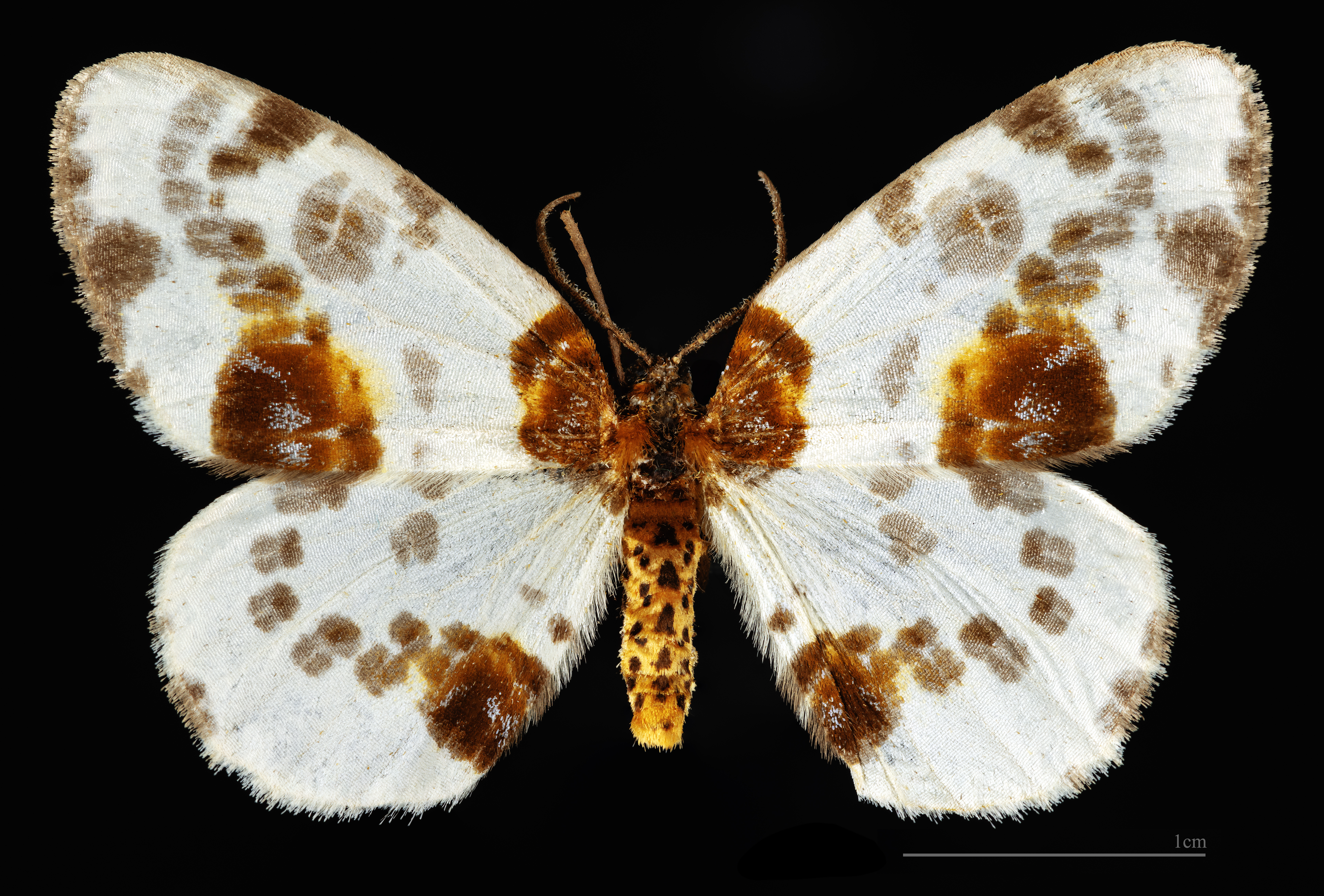
♂

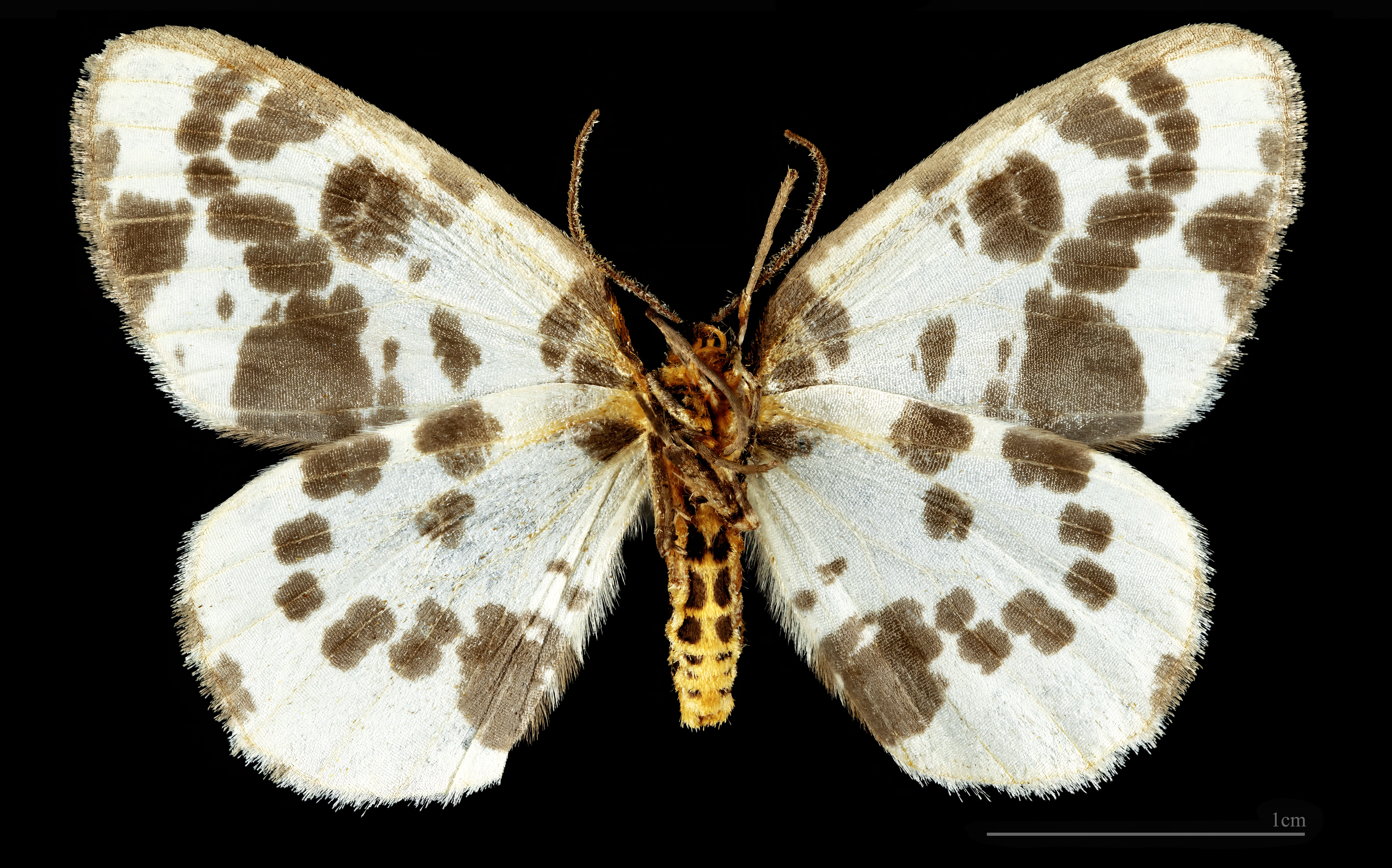
♂ △

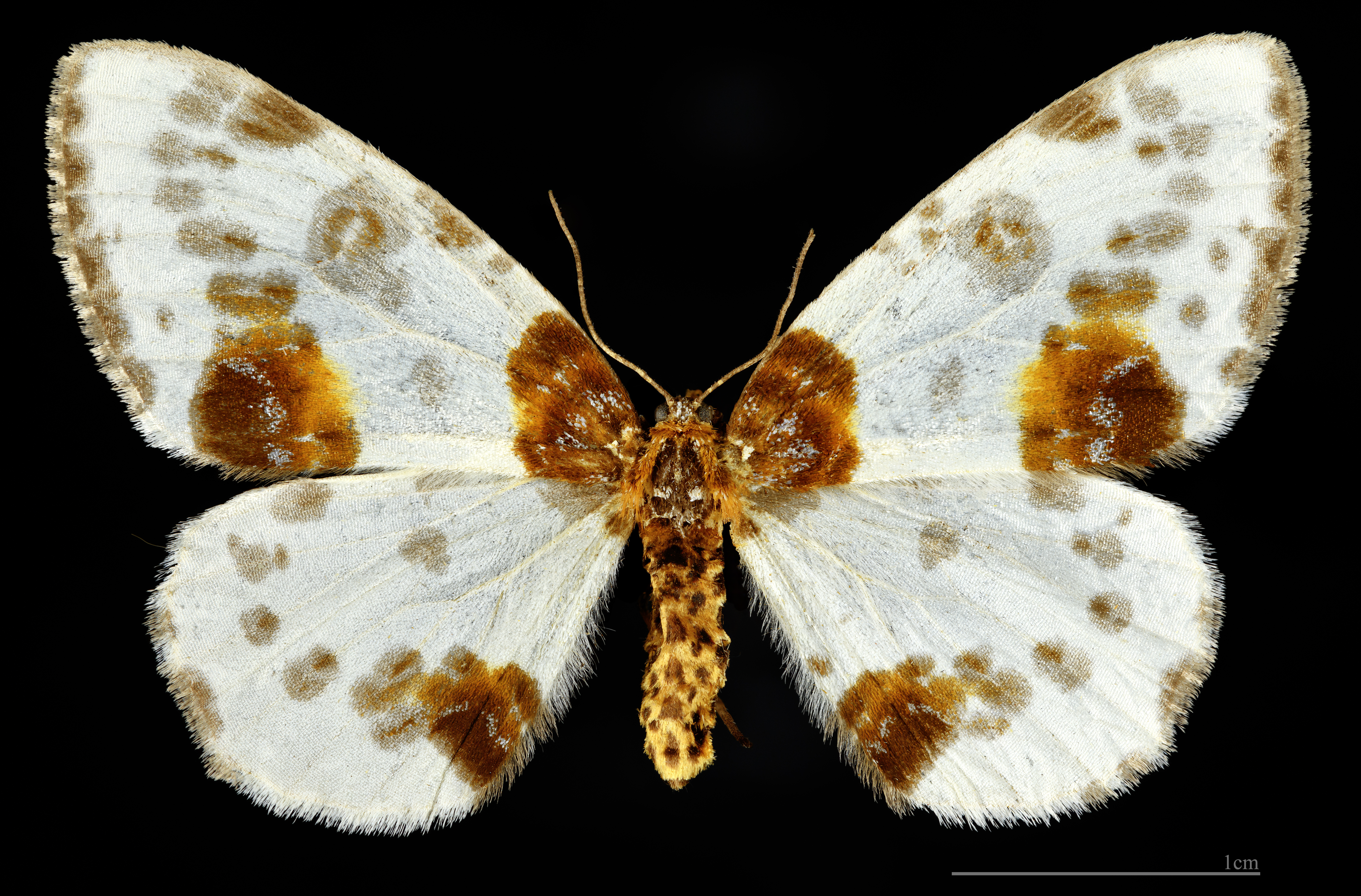
♀

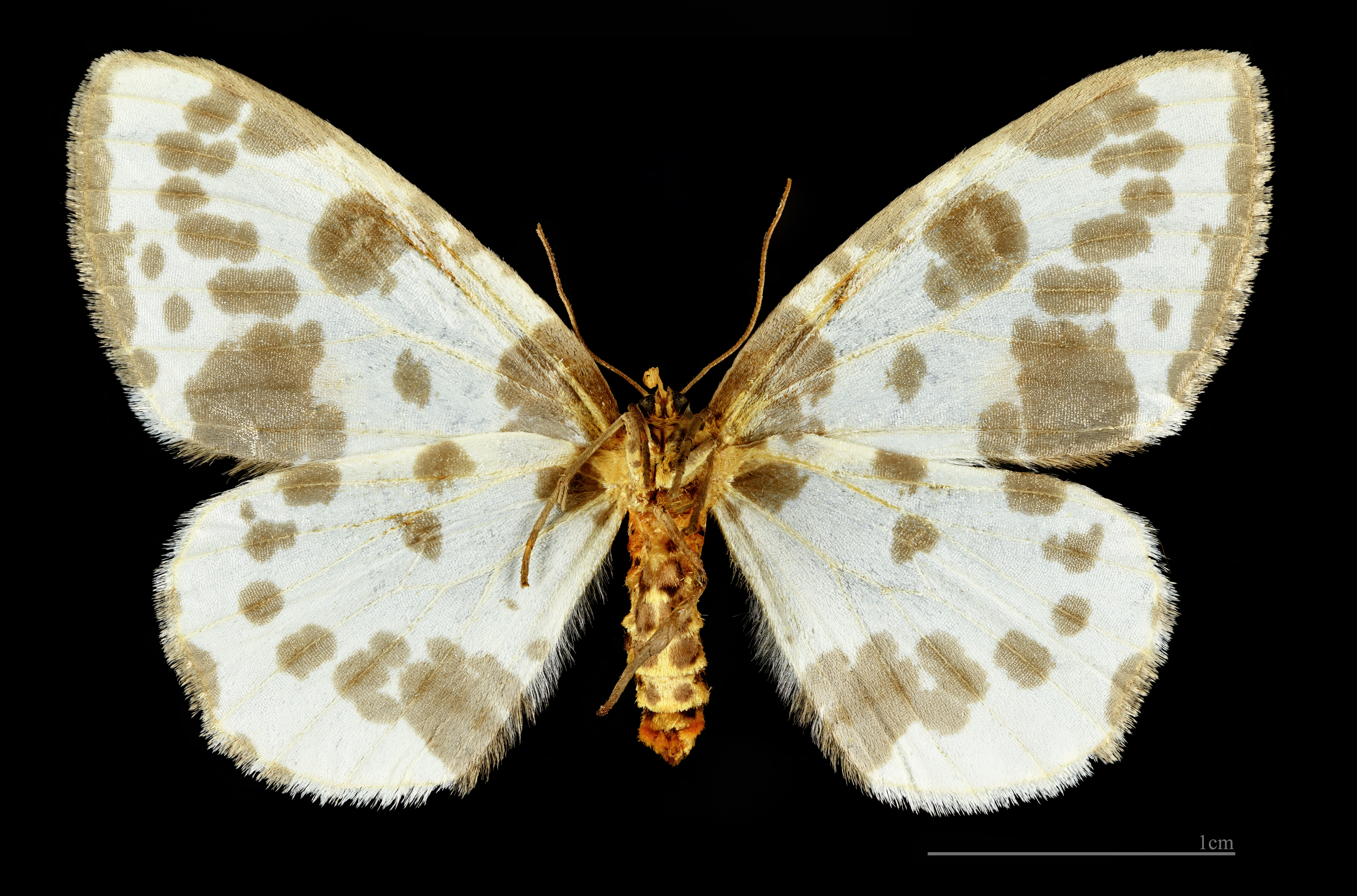
♀ △

== Subspecies ==
- Abraxas sylvata sylvata
- Abraxas sylvata microtate Wehrli, 1931 (Japan)

== Biology ==
The adults fly from late May to early August. They are attracted to light. The moth is nocturnal and is easy to find during the day. They are easy to find resting during the morning. The moth starts being active at early dusk. The moths eat the plants Betula, Corylus, Fagus, Ulmus, Prunus, and Frangula. Caterpillars appear from mid-July to early October. They overwinter as a pupa. The body of the caterpillar is distinctive because it is marked with longitudinal black and yellow stripes. The caterpillars feed on wych elm and European elm. The pupa hibernates underground. The caterpillars live on several deciduous trees such as Fagus sylvatica, Ulmus glabra, and Ulmus procera.

== Distribution and habitat ==
The species can be found from Europe to Japan. The moth can be found in forests, thickets, and sometimes parks on various deciduous trees.

== Other ==
Abraxas grossulariata is similar to this species. In a group of specimens of this species, the largest one is 60 mm. while the smallest one is 31 mm. The moth is more common in the East Palearctic than in Europe. The species is listed as a priority species in the United Kingdom Biodiversity Action Plan.

== Gallery ==
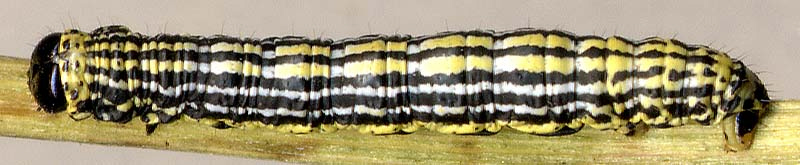
Larva

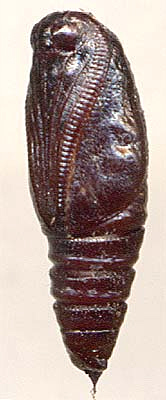
Pupa

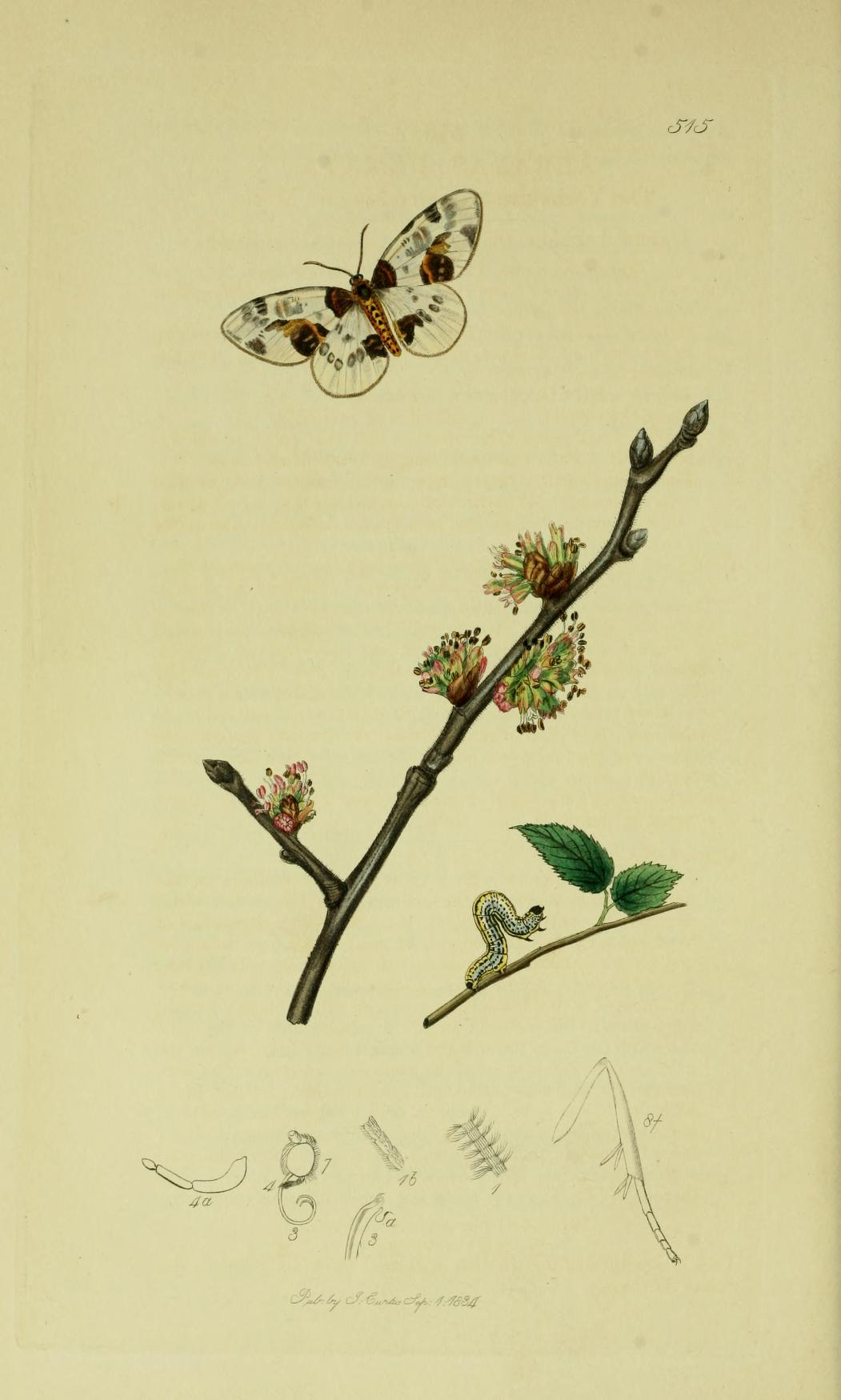
Illustration from John Curtis's British Entomology Volume 6
