= Abraxas picaria =

Scientific classification
- Domain: Eukaryota
- Kingdom: Animalia
- Phylum: Arthropoda
- Class: Insecta
- Order: Lepidoptera
- Family: Geometridae
- Genus: Abraxas
- Species: A. picaria

Binomial name
- Abraxas picaria Moore, [1868]

Species of moth

Abraxas picaria is a species of moth belonging to the family Geometridae. It was described by Frederic Moore in 1868. It is known from Bengal.
