= Abraxas breueri =

Scientific classification
- Domain: Eukaryota
- Kingdom: Animalia
- Phylum: Arthropoda
- Class: Insecta
- Order: Lepidoptera
- Family: Geometridae
- Genus: Abraxas
- Species: A. breueri

Binomial name
- Abraxas breueri Stüning & Hausmann, 2002

Species of moth

Abraxas breueri is a species of moth belonging to the family Geometridae. It was described by Dieter Stüning and Axel Hausmann in 2002. It is known from Mindanao in the Philippines.

The wingspan is 33–40 mm [1.29 - 1.57 in.].
