= Abraxas pusilla =

Scientific classification
- Domain: Eukaryota
- Kingdom: Animalia
- Phylum: Arthropoda
- Class: Insecta
- Order: Lepidoptera
- Family: Geometridae
- Genus: Abraxas
- Species: A. pusilla

Binomial name
- Abraxas pusilla Butler, 1880

Species of moth

Abraxas pusilla is a species of moth belonging to the family Geometridae. It was described by Arthur Gardiner Butler in 1880. It is known from Darjeeling in India.
