= Abraxas celidota =

Scientific classification
- Kingdom: Animalia
- Phylum: Arthropoda
- Class: Insecta
- Order: Lepidoptera
- Family: Geometridae
- Genus: Abraxas
- Species: A. celidota

Binomial name
- Abraxas celidota Wehrli, 1931

Species of moth

Abraxas celidota is a nocturnal species of moth belonging to the family Geometridae. It was described by Wehrli in 1931. It is known from western China.
