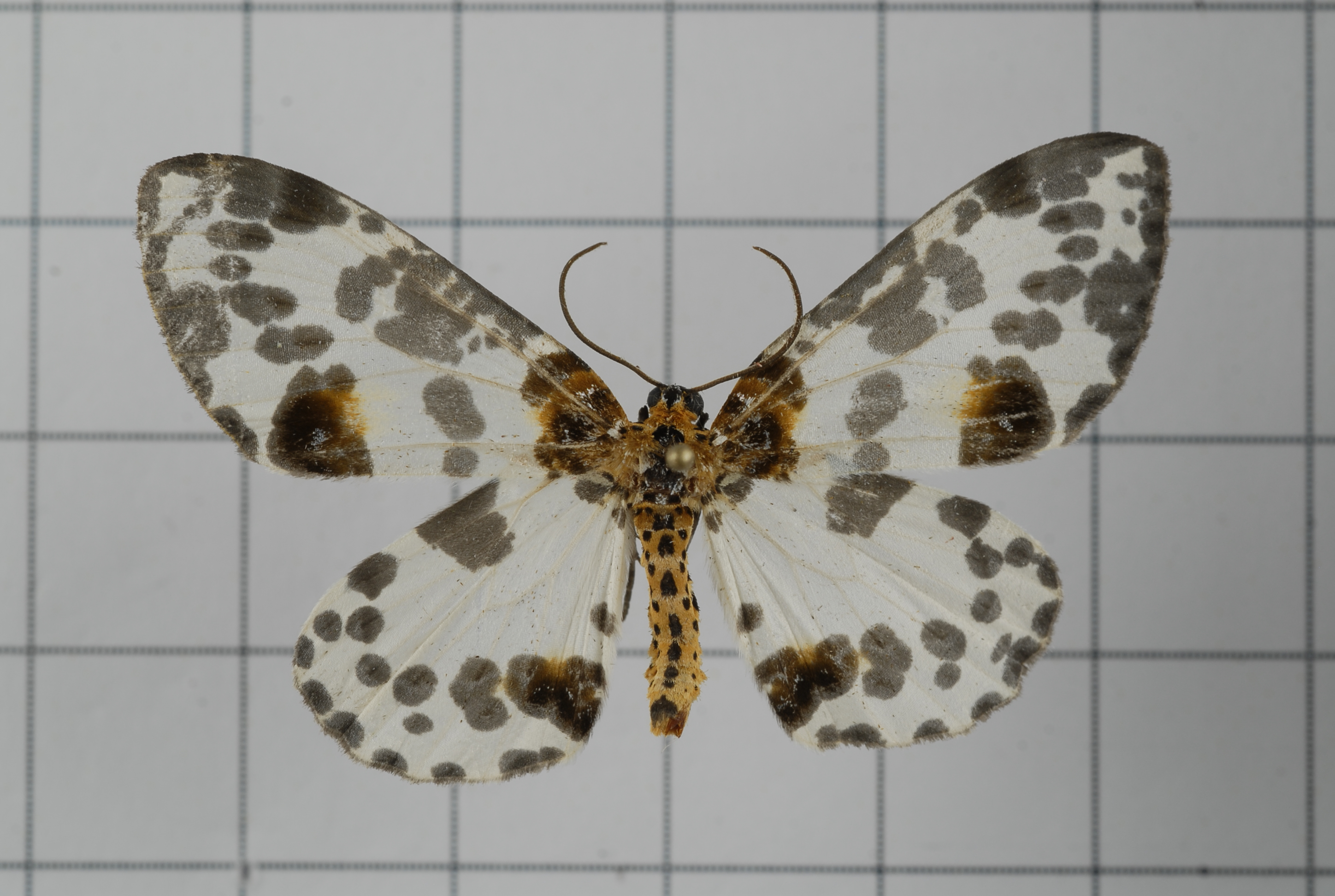

Scientific classification
- Kingdom: Animalia
- Phylum: Arthropoda
- Class: Insecta
- Order: Lepidoptera
- Family: Geometridae
- Genus: Abraxas
- Species: A. formosilluminata

Binomial name
- Abraxas formosilluminata Inoue, 1984

= Abraxas formosilluminata =

Species of moth

Abraxas formosilluminata is a species of moth belonging to the family Geometridae. It was described by Hiroshi Inoue in 1984. It is known from Japan and Taiwan.
