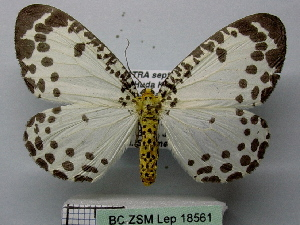

Scientific classification
- Domain: Eukaryota
- Kingdom: Animalia
- Phylum: Arthropoda
- Class: Insecta
- Order: Lepidoptera
- Family: Geometridae
- Genus: Abraxas
- Species: A. invasata

Binomial name
- Abraxas invasata Warren, 1897

= Abraxas invasata =

Species of moth

Abraxas invasata is a species of moth belonging to the family Geometridae. It was described by William Warren in 1897 and it originates in Borneo.

Its habitat consists of lower and upper mountain regions. The species mostly flies by day but may also come to light at night.
