= Abraxas degener =

Scientific classification
- Domain: Eukaryota
- Kingdom: Animalia
- Phylum: Arthropoda
- Class: Insecta
- Order: Lepidoptera
- Family: Geometridae
- Genus: Abraxas
- Species: A. degener

Binomial name
- Abraxas degener Warren, 1894

Species of moth

Abraxas degener is a species of moth belonging to the family Geometridae. It was described by Warren in 1894.
