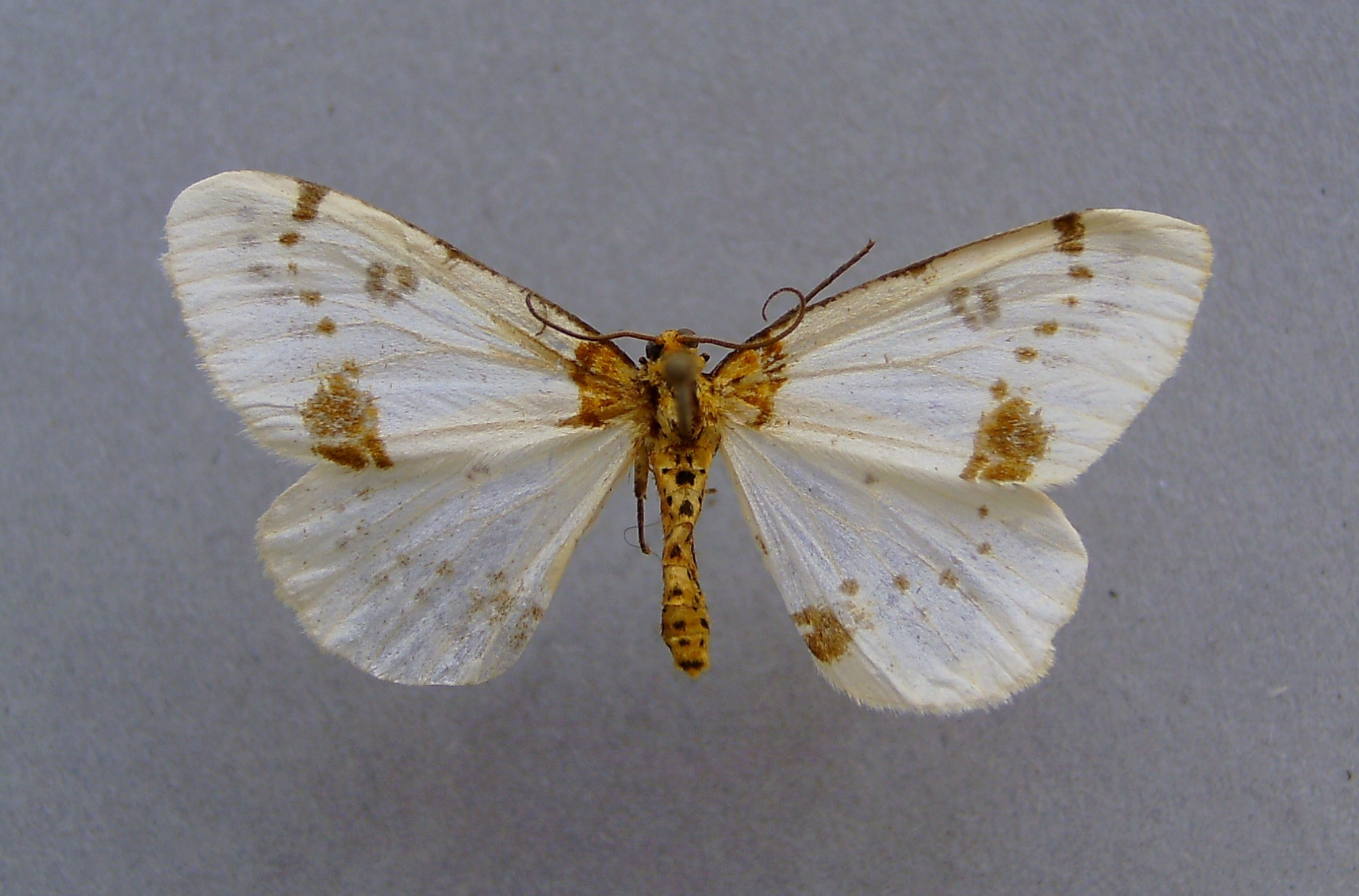

Scientific classification
- Kingdom: Animalia
- Phylum: Arthropoda
- Clade: Pancrustacea
- Class: Insecta
- Order: Lepidoptera
- Family: Geometridae
- Genus: Abraxas
- Species: A. pantaria

Binomial name
- Abraxas pantaria (Linnaeus, 1767)

Synonyms
- Phalaena pantaria Linnaeus, 1767

= Abraxas pantaria =

Species of moth

Abraxas pantaria, the light magpie or spotted ash looper is a species of moth belonging to the family Geometridae. It was described by Carl Linnaeus in 1767. It is found in the Mediterranean and is common in Portugal and Spain. It is also known from the United Kingdom, Ireland, Croatia, Armenia and Georgia south-eastern Russia and Turkey.

The wingspan is 38–42 mm for females and 35–40 mm for males.
