= Abraxis =

Abraxis may refer to:

- Abraxis BioScience, a wholly owned biopharmaceutical subsidiary of the biotechnology company Celgene
- Abraxis, a fictional spacecraft, the primary setting for the animated film Dead Space: Aftermath
- Creeper World 3: Abraxis, a video game in the Creeper World franchise
- Abraxis, the name of the primary character in the Necropolis video game
- Abraxis, an extra-dimensional being from the 1991–92 DC Comics storyline "Armageddon Inferno"
- Abraxis, a 3-D-puzzle, 64 small cubes fixed to 13 parts combine to a 4x4x4 cube
- Abraxis, a psy-trance trio formed by Seven Lions and Dimibo.

== See also ==
- The Abraxis Wren Chronicles
- ABRIXAS
- Abraxas (disambiguation)
