= Abraxas gephyra =

Scientific classification
- Kingdom: Animalia
- Phylum: Arthropoda
- Clade: Pancrustacea
- Class: Insecta
- Order: Lepidoptera
- Family: Geometridae
- Genus: Abraxas
- Species: A. gephyra

Binomial name
- Abraxas gephyra West, 1929

Species of moth

Abraxas gephyra is a species of moth belonging to the family Geometridae. It was described by West in 1929. It is commonly found in Luzon, an island in the Philippines.
