= Computer Incident Advisory Capability =

Computer Incident Advisory Capability (CIAC) was the original computer security incident response team at the United States Department of Energy. CIAC was formed in February 1989, and jointly sponsored by the DOE Office of the CIO and the Air Force. The primary function of CIAC was, as the name implies, to advise people of computer incidents. Primarily, this means security vulnerabilities, virus and hoax alerts and similar information security concerns. CIAC was a founding member of GFIRST, the Government Forum of Incident Response and Security Teams and FIRST, an international incident response and security organization. CIAC published incident reports and bulletins up until it was officially renamed to DOE-CIRC and relocated to Las Vegas, Nevada in October 2008.
