= Abraxas intervacuata =

Scientific classification
- Domain: Eukaryota
- Kingdom: Animalia
- Phylum: Arthropoda
- Class: Insecta
- Order: Lepidoptera
- Family: Geometridae
- Genus: Abraxas
- Species: A. intervacuata

Binomial name
- Abraxas intervacuata (Warren, 1896)

Synonyms
- Potera intervacuata Warren, 1896

Species of moth

Abraxas intervacuata is a species of moth belonging to the family Geometridae. It was described by Warren in 1896.

== Distribution ==
It is known from Borneo, Java and Sulawesi.
