= Abraxas punctifera =

Scientific classification
- Kingdom: Animalia
- Phylum: Arthropoda
- Class: Insecta
- Order: Lepidoptera
- Family: Geometridae
- Genus: Abraxas
- Species: A. punctifera

Binomial name
- Abraxas punctifera Walker, [1865]

Species of moth

Abraxas punctifera is a species of moth belonging to the family Geometridae. It was described by Francis Walker in 1865. It is known from the Aru Islands of Indonesia.
