= Abraxas metamorpha =

Scientific classification
- Domain: Eukaryota
- Kingdom: Animalia
- Phylum: Arthropoda
- Class: Insecta
- Order: Lepidoptera
- Family: Geometridae
- Genus: Abraxas
- Species: A. metamorpha

Binomial name
- Abraxas metamorpha Warren, 1893

Species of moth

Abraxas metamorpha is a species of moth belonging to the family Geometridae. It was described by Warren in 1893. It is known from Sikkim in India.
