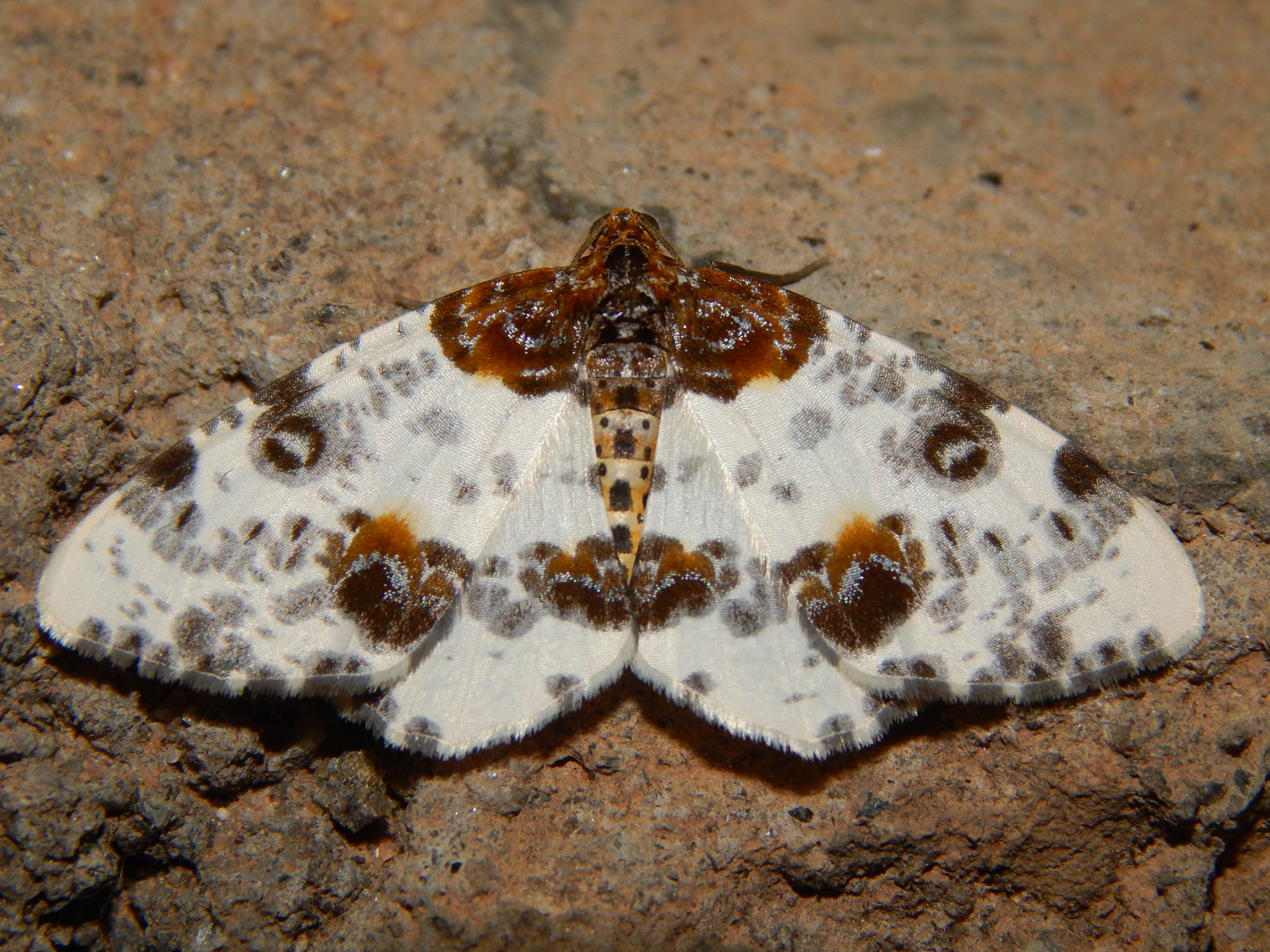

Scientific classification
- Kingdom: Animalia
- Phylum: Arthropoda
- Class: Insecta
- Order: Lepidoptera
- Family: Geometridae
- Genus: Abraxas
- Species: A. leucostola

Binomial name
- Abraxas leucostola Hampson, 1893

= Abraxas leucostola =

Species of moth

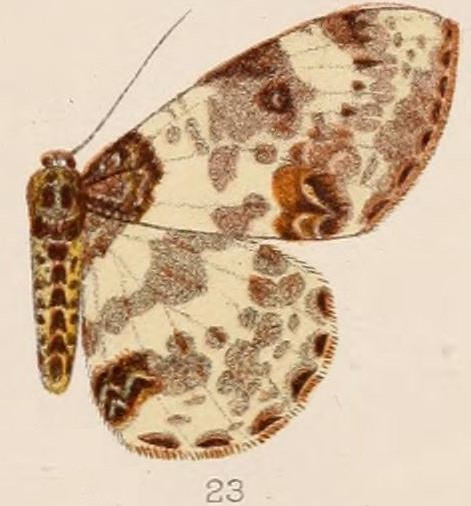
Abraxas leucostola ssp. argyrosticta

Abraxas leucostola is a moth of the family Geometridae.
