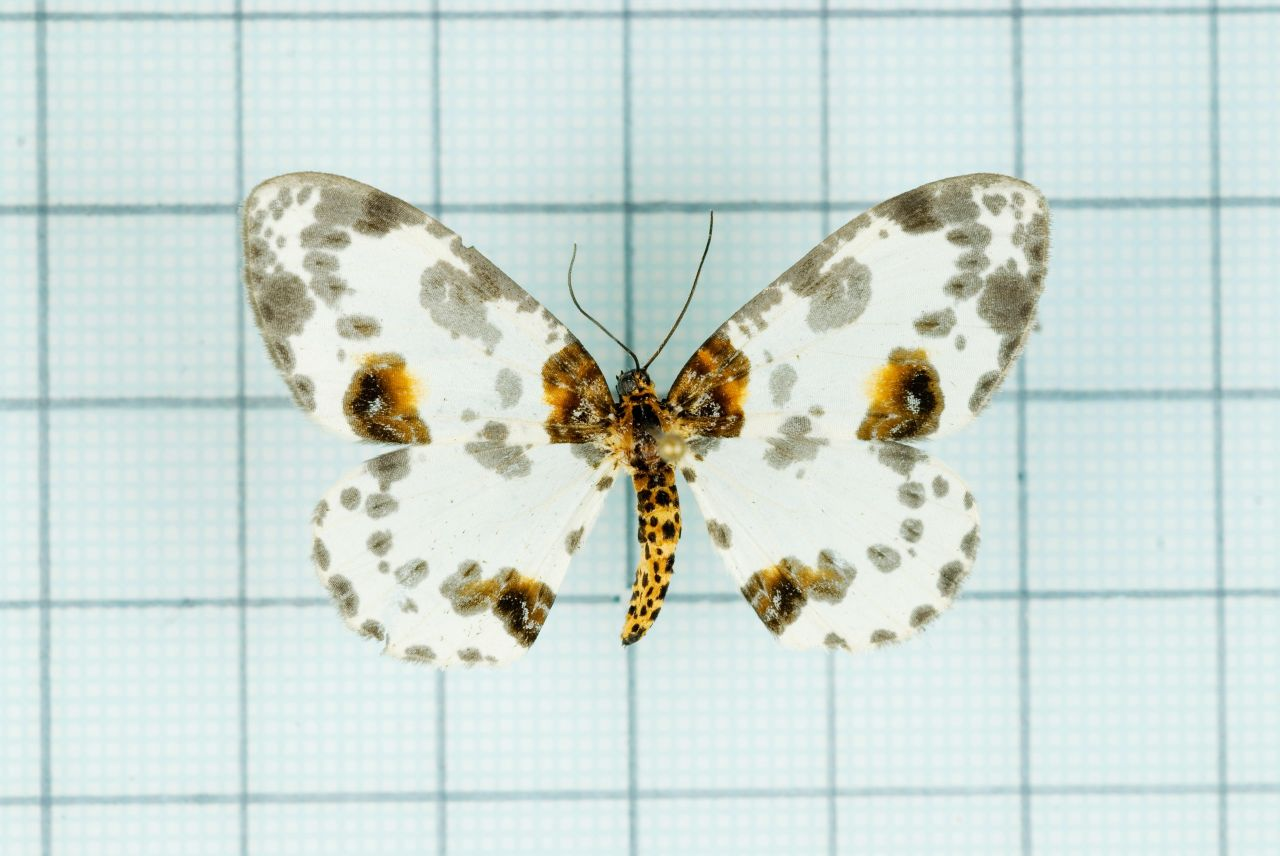

Scientific classification
- Kingdom: Animalia
- Phylum: Arthropoda
- Clade: Pancrustacea
- Class: Insecta
- Order: Lepidoptera
- Family: Geometridae
- Genus: Abraxas
- Species: A. illuminata

Binomial name
- Abraxas illuminata Warren, 1894

Synonyms
- Silabraxas kanshireiensis Wileman, 1915; Abraxas kanshireiensis

= Abraxas illuminata =

Species of moth

Abraxas illuminata is a species of moth belonging to the family Geometridae. It was described by Warren in 1894. It is known from Sikkim and Darjeeling in India, as well as China and Taiwan.

The wingspan is about 47 mm.

The larvae have been recorded feeding on Celastrus hindsii.
