= Abraxas albiquadrata =

Scientific classification
- Domain: Eukaryota
- Kingdom: Animalia
- Phylum: Arthropoda
- Class: Insecta
- Order: Lepidoptera
- Family: Geometridae
- Genus: Abraxas
- Species: A. albiquadrata

Binomial name
- Abraxas albiquadrata (Warren, 1897)

Synonyms
- Potera albiquadrata Warren, 1897

Species of moth

Abraxas albiquadrata is a species of moth belonging to the family Geometridae. It was described by Warren in 1897. It is known from Ceram and Bacan.
