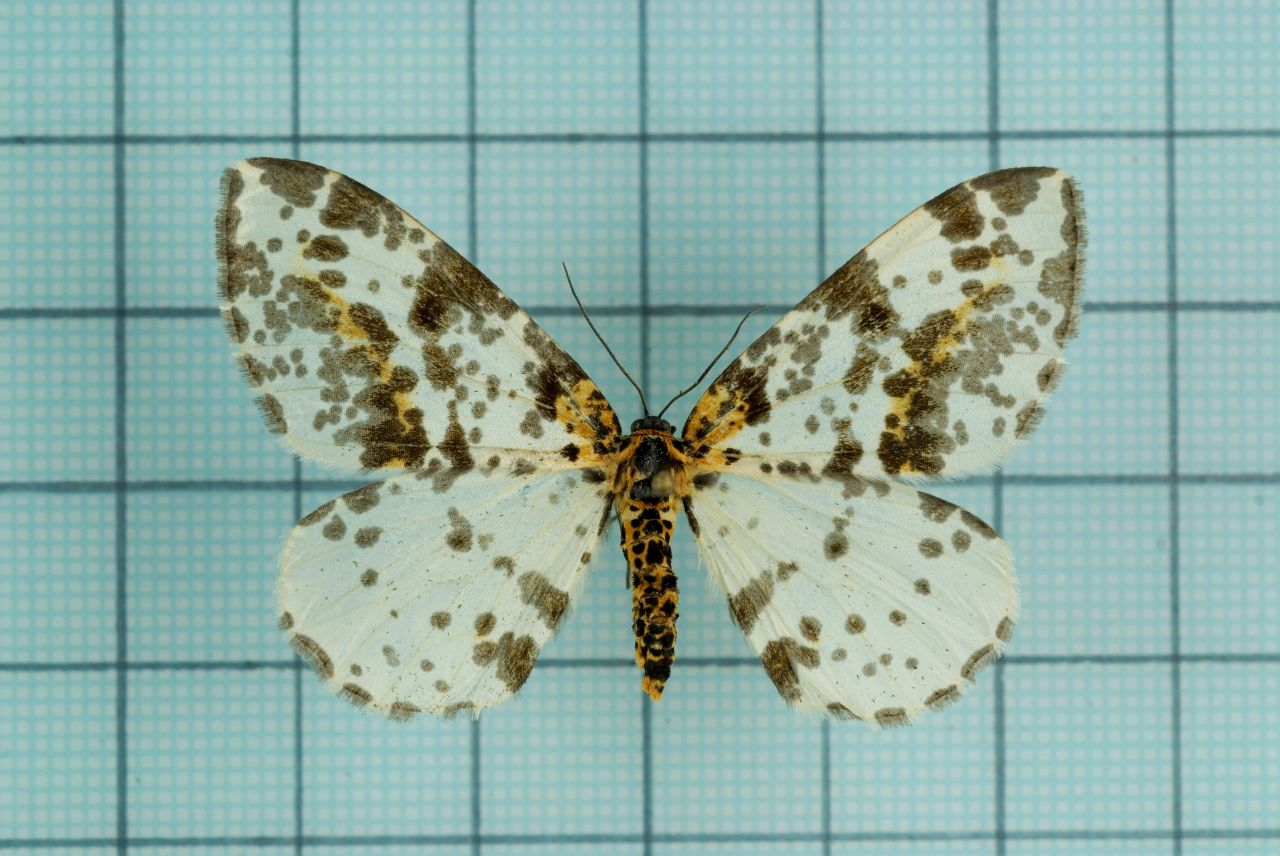

Scientific classification
- Kingdom: Animalia
- Phylum: Arthropoda
- Clade: Pancrustacea
- Class: Insecta
- Order: Lepidoptera
- Family: Geometridae
- Genus: Abraxas
- Species: A. consputa

Binomial name
- Abraxas consputa Bastelberger, 1909

= Abraxas consputa =

Species of insect

Abraxas consputa is a moth in the family Geometridae. It is endemic to Taiwan.
