= Abraxas albiplaga =

Scientific classification
- Kingdom: Animalia
- Phylum: Arthropoda
- Class: Insecta
- Order: Lepidoptera
- Family: Geometridae
- Genus: Abraxas
- Species: A. albiplaga

Binomial name
- Abraxas albiplaga (Warren, 1894)

Synonyms
- Omophyseta albiplaga Warren, 1894

Species of moth

Abraxas albiplaga is a species of moth belonging to the family Geometridae. It was described by Warren in 1894. It is known from southern Sulawesi.
