= ARCV-n =

Virus Family

N/A

Malware details
- Technical name: N/A
- Aliases: ARCV-1, -2, -3, -4, -5, -6, -7, -8, -9, -10, -10B; ARCV.335, 339, 541, 562, 639, 651, 664, 670, 679, 693, 718, 745, 773, 795, 795.b, 826, 827, 839, 916, 916.b, 965, 986, 1060, 1072, 1172, 1208
- Type: DOS
- Subtype: COM and EXE infector
- Classification: Virus
- Family: ARCV-n
- Isolation date: 1992
- Origin: England
- Author: ARCV

ARCV-n is a large family of viruses authored by the Association of Really Cruel Viruses (ARCV) group through October - November 1992. and polymorphed with the PS-MPC virus generation tool (hence they are very similar). A polymorphic virus mutates itself to avoid detection by traditional antivirus and antimalware software. ARCV-n viruses seem to infect COM (perhaps command.com) and/or EXE files rapidly, but do not damage the compromised machine, instead displaying various text messages to the user. An infected file will have the ARCV-n virus appended to the end of it.

The ARCV group of virus writers created close to 100 new viruses in the 3 months they were active, before they were raided by New Scotland Yard in December, January, and February 1993.

Select ARCV viruses were still being circulated at least through 1998, based on virus tables from the Computer Incident Advisory Capability.

ARCV-n family members
Member name	String contained	Trigger date	Extra behavior/displayed text
Arcv.335	[ARCV-6] Apache *.com
Arcv.339	[ARCV-5] Apache Warrior, ARCV. Pres.
Arcv.541	[ARCV-7] Apache ARCV. *.exe
Arcv.562	[X-1] ICE-9	March 3	ICE-9 Presents In Association with The ARcV [X-1] Michelangelo activates -< TOMORROW >-
Arcv.639	[ARCV93] ICE-9	January	Happy New Year from the ARCV Released 1 June 1992. Made in England by ICE-9
Arcv.651	[ARCV-3] Apache Warrior.	February	Yo.. I've Just Found a Virus.. Opps.. Sorry I'm the Virus. Well let me introduce myself.. I am ARCV-3 Virus, by Apache Warrior. Long Live The ARCV and Whats an Hard ECU? Vote Yes to the Best Vote ARCV..
Arcv.664	[ARCV-4] Apache Warrior, ARCV Pres. *.exe *.com	May 9	So Who's the Best Then? Oh Well Sorry But The ARCV Are The Best! Well Your in Favor with Us then.
Arcv.670	Made in ENGLAND. [ARCVXMAS] by ICE-9 Released June 1992.	December 20 until 25	Happy Xmas from The ARCV.
Arcv.679	Naughty, Naughtyall ARCV Productions Ltd. [ARCV-8] *.exe
Arcv.693	[ARCV-2] Apache Warrior, ARCV. Pres.	April	Help.. Help.. I'm Sinking........
Arcv.718	[SOLOMoN] ICE-9		Hello Dr Sol. & Fido. Lurve U lots ICE-9 (c) 1992 ARCV. P.S. Apache sez Hi(Dos)
Arcv.745	[ARCV-9] Apache Warrior. *.com
Arcv.773	[Slime] By Apache Warrior, ARCV Pres. Sliming around your PC, I go make a sticky MESS over your Hard Drive!
Arcv.795	[SCROLL] ICE-9 ARcV \COMMAND.COM		//scrolls up the screen
Arcv.795.b	[X-2] ICE-9, -< ARCV >- Made in England. Hi I'am called X-2, get my name right! Look out for the X-3 twins.
Arcv.826	[ARCV-1] Apache Warrior, ARCV Pres.	June 15	Long Live The ARCV. MUFC for the League! (c) Apache Warrior, ARCV Pres. 92 Welcome to the REAL World. And the ARCV 1 Virus!
Arcv.827	[ARCV-10] Apache Warrior.		Well its finally here The -= ARCV =- Welcome To our New Members..........
Arcv.839	[FRIENDS] i486X
Arcv.916	[JO] By Apache Warrior, ARCV Pres.	December 10	Looking Good Slimline Joanna. Made in England by Apache Warrior, ARCV Pres. Jo Ver. 1.11 (c) Apache Warrior 92. I Love You Joanna, Apache..
Arcv.916.b	JO Exerciser Virus. Apache Warrior, ARCV Pres. [JOEXE]
Arcv.965	[Joshua]		Guess what ??? You have been victimized by a virus!!! Do not try to reboot your computer or even turn it off. You might as well read this and weep!
Arcv.986	[JO] By Apache Warrior, ARCV Pres.		This is Dedicated To the Girl I Love, Joanna Dicks. Made in England by Apache Warrior, ARCV Pres. Jo Ver. 1.01 (c) Apache Warrior 92. I Love You Joanna, Apache..
Arcv.1060	[X-3b] ICE-9 (c) 1992 ICE-9 Written Oct 1992 Look out 4 future Releases		THE TWINS [X-3a] & [X-3b] ARE ON YOUR PC. ICE-9
Arcv.1072	[ReaperMan] Apache Warrior
Arcv.1172	[Sandwich] By Apache Warrior, ARCV Pres.		Which ARCV Member Likes a Sandwich? Cheese, Beef Spread, Cucumber and Crisp Corned Beef and Salad Cream Jaffa Cake and Hamster on Rye Is it A. Apache Warrior B. ICE-9 C. Slartibartfast Select a Letter: Well you know you're ARCV Members. Bad Luck.. Better Luck Next Time.
Arcv.1208	[SCYTHE] Apache Warrior, ARCV Pres.	December 12	This is the Scythe for Reaper Man. Beware I'm Sharp! Made in England by Apache Warrior, ARCV Pres. Scythe Ver. 1.01 (c) Apache Warrior 92. Reaper Man Swung The SCYTHE and the PC Died!
