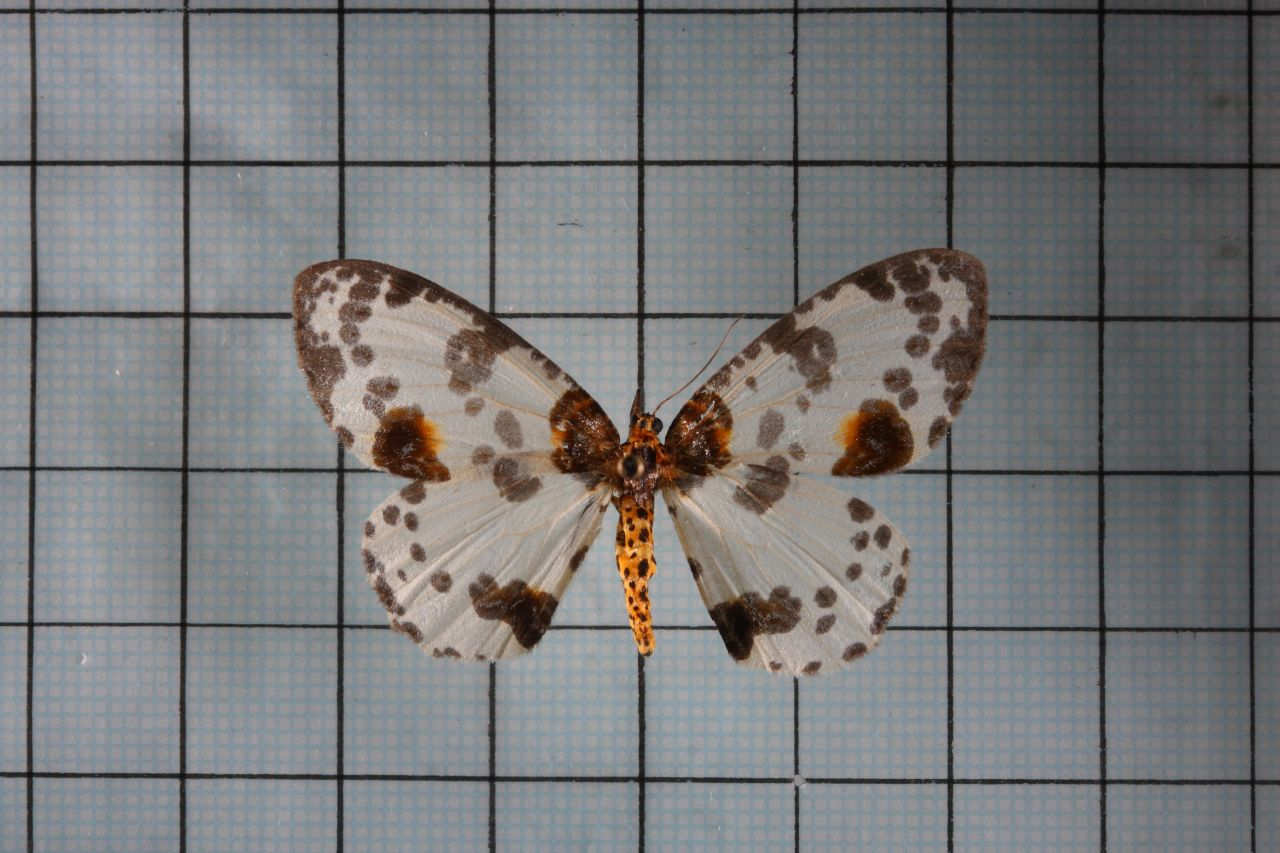

Scientific classification
- Domain: Eukaryota
- Kingdom: Animalia
- Phylum: Arthropoda
- Class: Insecta
- Order: Lepidoptera
- Family: Geometridae
- Genus: Abraxas
- Species: A. suspecta

Binomial name
- Abraxas suspecta (Warren, 1894)

= Abraxas suspecta =

Species of moth

Abraxas suspecta is a species of moth belonging to the family Geometridae. It was described by William Warren in 1894. It is known from China.

There are four generations per year.

The larvae feed on Euonymus japonicus. The species overwinters as a pupa.
