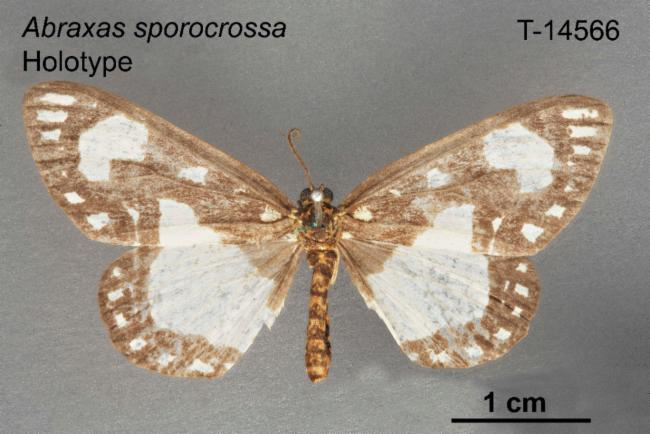

Scientific classification
- Domain: Eukaryota
- Kingdom: Animalia
- Phylum: Arthropoda
- Class: Insecta
- Order: Lepidoptera
- Family: Geometridae
- Genus: Abraxas
- Species: A. sporocrossa

Binomial name
- Abraxas sporocrossa Turner, 1922

= Abraxas sporocrossa =

Species of moth

Abraxas sporocrossa is a species of moth belonging to the family Geometridae. It was described by Turner in 1922. It is known from Australia.
