= Abraxas triseriaria =

Scientific classification
- Domain: Eukaryota
- Kingdom: Animalia
- Phylum: Arthropoda
- Class: Insecta
- Order: Lepidoptera
- Family: Geometridae
- Genus: Abraxas
- Species: A. triseriaria

Binomial name
- Abraxas triseriaria Herrich-Schäffer, [1855]

Synonyms
- Potera marginata Moore, [1879]

Species of moth

Abraxas triseriaria is a species of moth belonging to the family Geometridae. It was described by Gottlieb August Wilhelm Herrich-Schäffer in 1855. It is known from Myanmar, Sumatra and Java.
