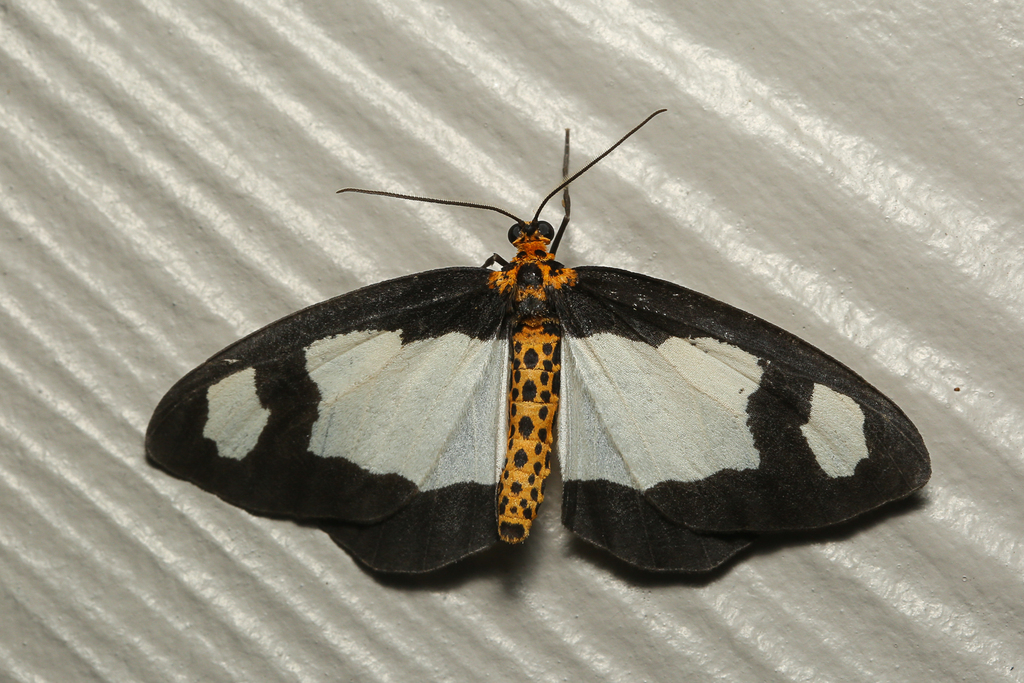
- image CC-BY 4.0 by dhfischer

Scientific classification
- Kingdom: Animalia
- Phylum: Arthropoda
- Class: Insecta
- Order: Lepidoptera
- Family: Geometridae
- Genus: Abraxas
- Species: A. expectata

Binomial name
- Abraxas expectata Warren, 1902

= Abraxas expectata =

Species of moth

Abraxas expectata is a species of moth belonging to the family Geometridae. It was described by Warren in 1902. It is known from Australia (north Queensland).
