= Abraxas sinopicaria =

Scientific classification
- Domain: Eukaryota
- Kingdom: Animalia
- Phylum: Arthropoda
- Class: Insecta
- Order: Lepidoptera
- Family: Geometridae
- Genus: Abraxas
- Species: A. sinopicaria

Binomial name
- Abraxas sinopicaria Wehrli, 1934

Species of moth

Abraxas sinopicaria is a species of moth belonging to the family Geometridae. It was described by Wehrli in 1934. The species habitates around Sichuan, China.
