= Abraxas suffusa =

Scientific classification
- Domain: Eukaryota
- Kingdom: Animalia
- Phylum: Arthropoda
- Class: Insecta
- Order: Lepidoptera
- Family: Geometridae
- Genus: Abraxas
- Species: A. suffusa

Binomial name
- Abraxas suffusa Warren, 1894

Species of moth

Abraxas suffusa is a species of moth belonging to the family Geometridae. It was described by Warren in 1894. It is known from Tibet.
