= Abraxas martaria =

Scientific classification
- Kingdom: Animalia
- Phylum: Arthropoda
- Class: Insecta
- Order: Lepidoptera
- Family: Geometridae
- Genus: Abraxas
- Species: A. martaria

Binomial name
- Abraxas martaria Guenée, 1857

Species of moth

Abraxas martaria is a species of moth belonging to the family Geometridae. It was described by Achille Guenée in 1857. It is known from northern India.
