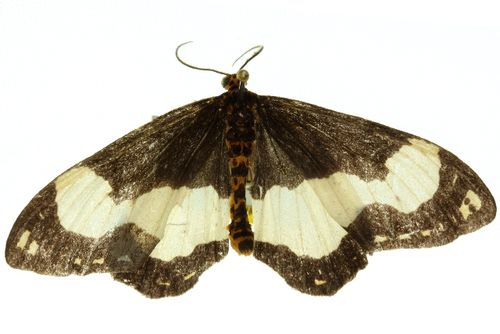
- (ANIC Database No. 31 040421

Scientific classification
- Domain: Eukaryota
- Kingdom: Animalia
- Phylum: Arthropoda
- Class: Insecta
- Order: Lepidoptera
- Family: Geometridae
- Genus: Abraxas
- Species: A. flavimacula

Binomial name
- Abraxas flavimacula (Warren, 1896)

Synonyms
- Potera flavimacula Warren, 1896; Chooreechillum distitans Lucas, 1901; Abraxas sibilloides Bastelberger, 1908

= Abraxas flavimacula =

Species of moth

Abraxas flavimacula is a species of moth belonging to the family Geometridae. It was first described as Potera flavimacula by Warren in 1896. It is known from Australia.
