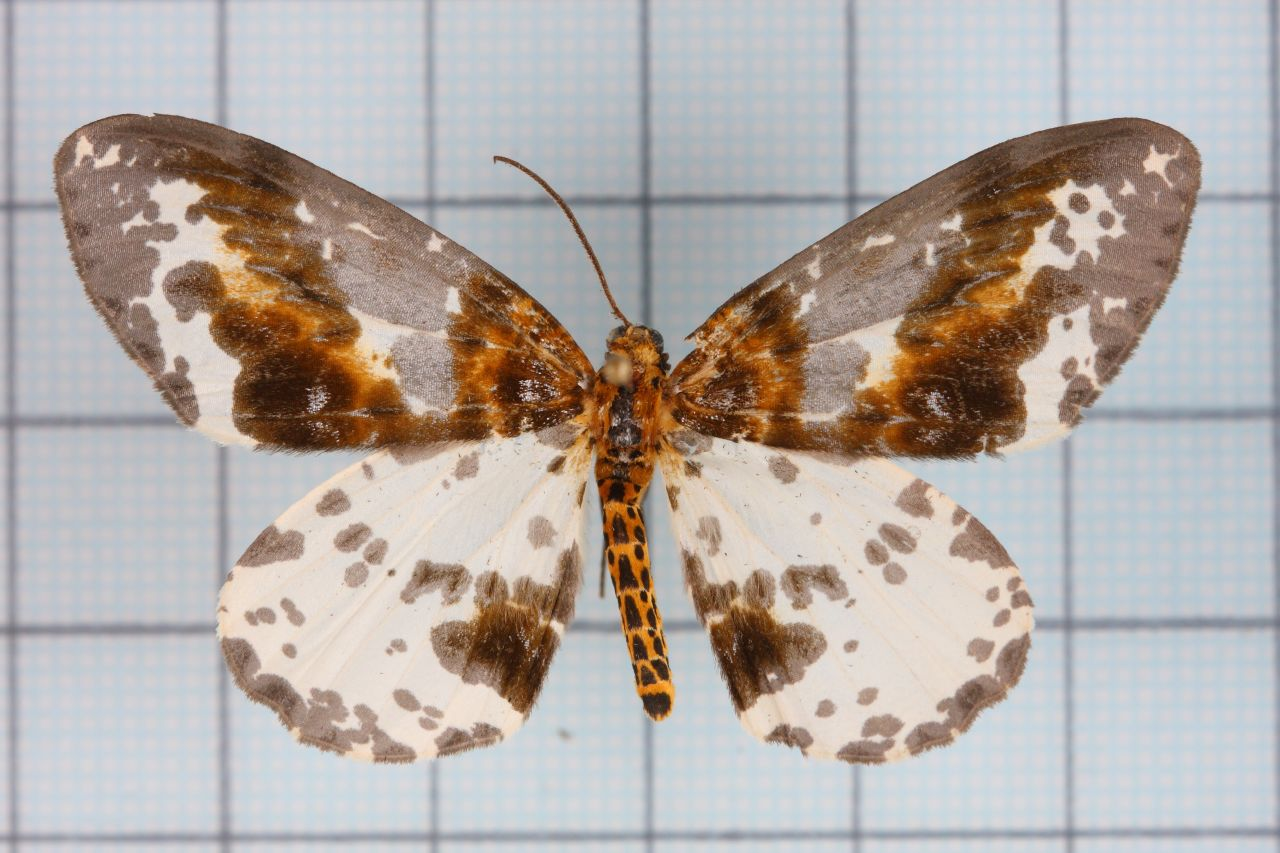

Scientific classification
- Kingdom: Animalia
- Phylum: Arthropoda
- Clade: Pancrustacea
- Class: Insecta
- Order: Lepidoptera
- Family: Geometridae
- Genus: Abraxas
- Species: A. taiwanensis

Binomial name
- Abraxas taiwanensis Inoue, 1984

= Abraxas taiwanensis =

Species of moth

Abraxas taiwanensis is a moth of the family Geometridae. It is found in Taiwan.
