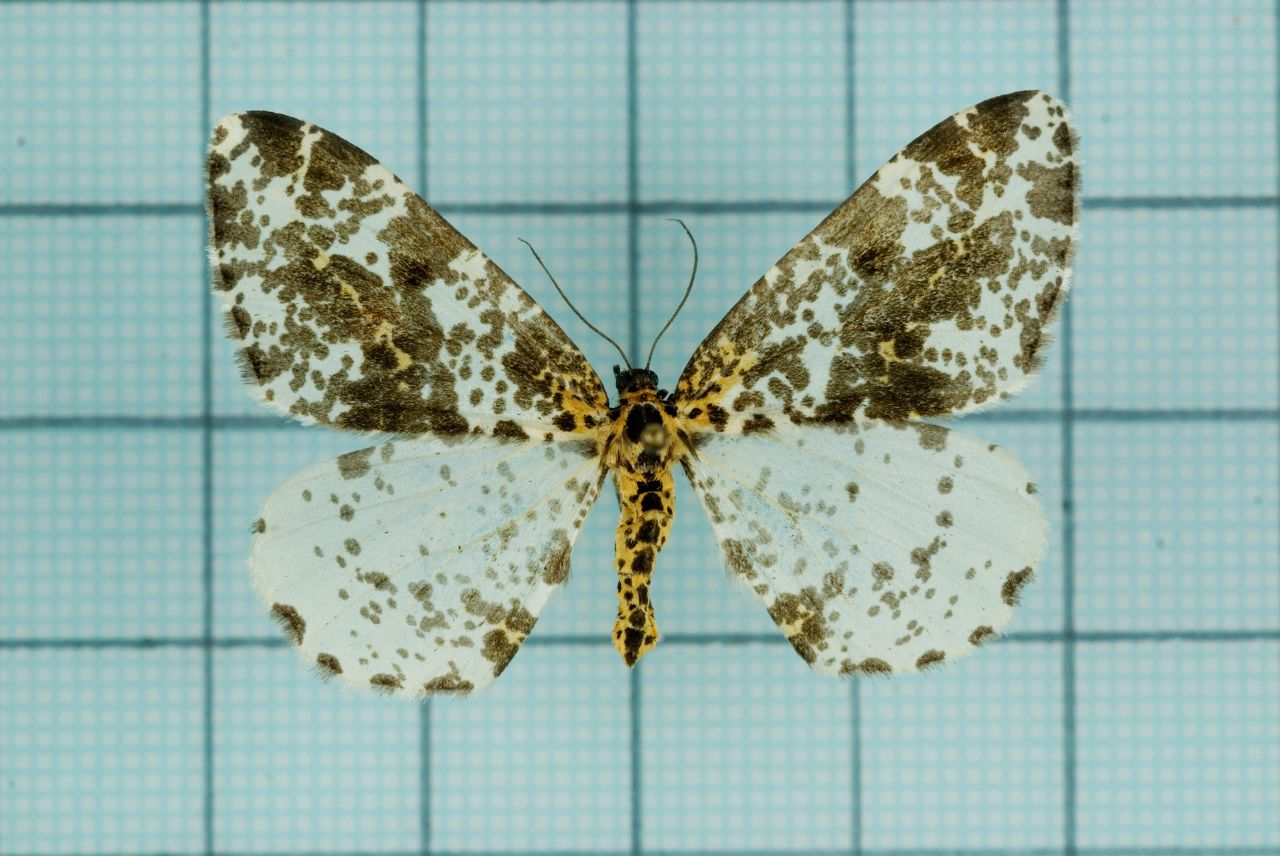

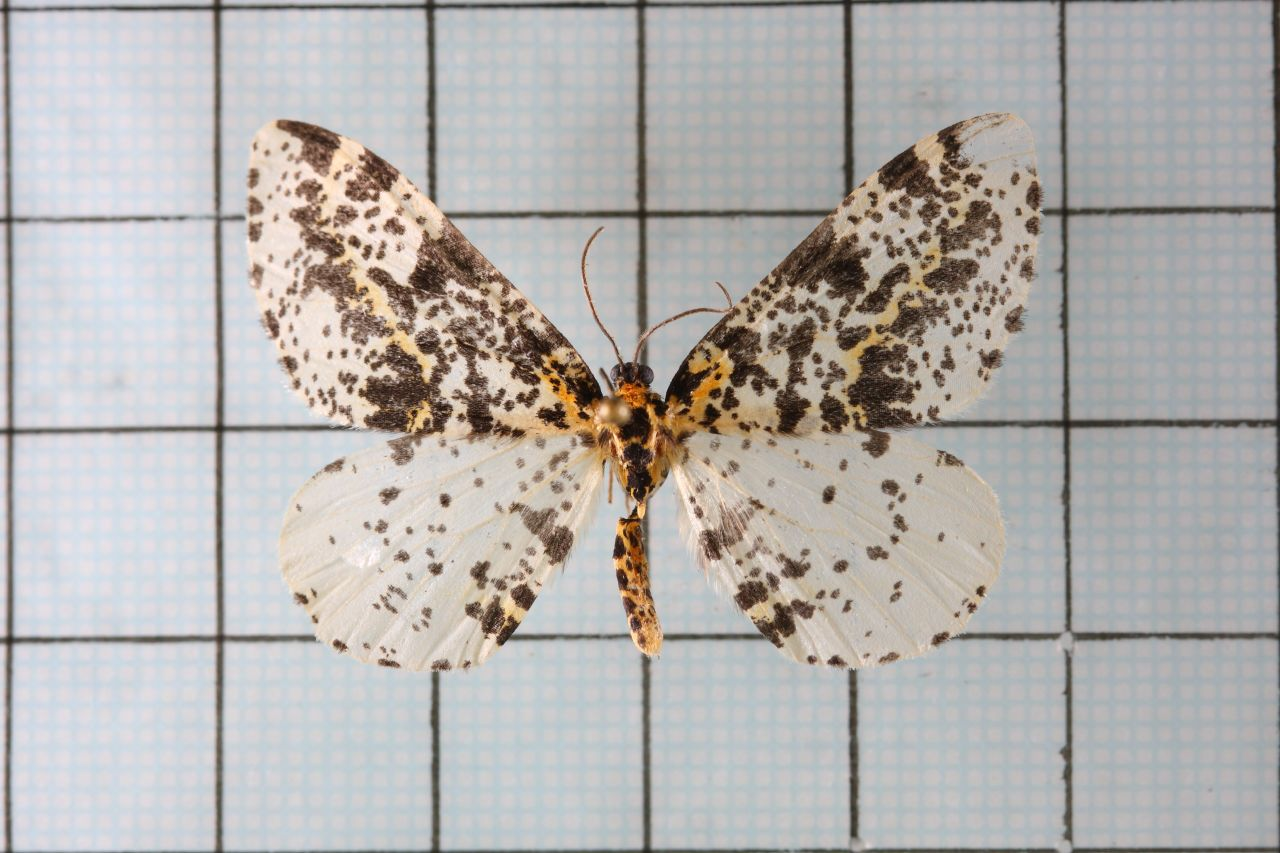

Scientific classification
- Kingdom: Animalia
- Phylum: Arthropoda
- Clade: Pancrustacea
- Class: Insecta
- Order: Lepidoptera
- Family: Geometridae
- Genus: Abraxas
- Species: A. fletcheri

Binomial name
- Abraxas fletcheri Inoue, 1984

= Abraxas fletcheri =

Species of moth

Abraxas fletcheri is a moth of the family Geometridae. It is found in Taiwan.
