= Abraxas niphonibia =

Scientific classification
- Domain: Eukaryota
- Kingdom: Animalia
- Phylum: Arthropoda
- Class: Insecta
- Order: Lepidoptera
- Family: Geometridae
- Genus: Abraxas
- Species: A. niphonibia

Binomial name
- Abraxas niphonibia Wehrli, 1935

Species of moth

Abraxas niphonibia is a species of moth belonging to the family Geometridae. It was described by Wehrli in 1935. It is known from Japan, Korea and the Kuriles.

The wingspan is 14–20 mm.
