= Abraxas membranacea =

Scientific classification
- Kingdom: Animalia
- Phylum: Arthropoda
- Class: Insecta
- Order: Lepidoptera
- Family: Geometridae
- Genus: Abraxas
- Species: A. membranacea

Binomial name
- Abraxas membranacea Warren, 1894

Species of moth

Abraxas membranacea is a species of moth belonging to the family Geometridae. It was described by Warren in 1894.
