= Abraxas stresemanni =

Scientific classification
- Domain: Eukaryota
- Kingdom: Animalia
- Phylum: Arthropoda
- Class: Insecta
- Order: Lepidoptera
- Family: Geometridae
- Genus: Abraxas
- Species: A. stresemanni

Binomial name
- Abraxas stresemanni Rothschild, 1915

Species of moth

Abraxas stresemanni is a species of moth belonging to the family Geometridae. It was described by Rothschild in 1915. It is known from Ceram.
