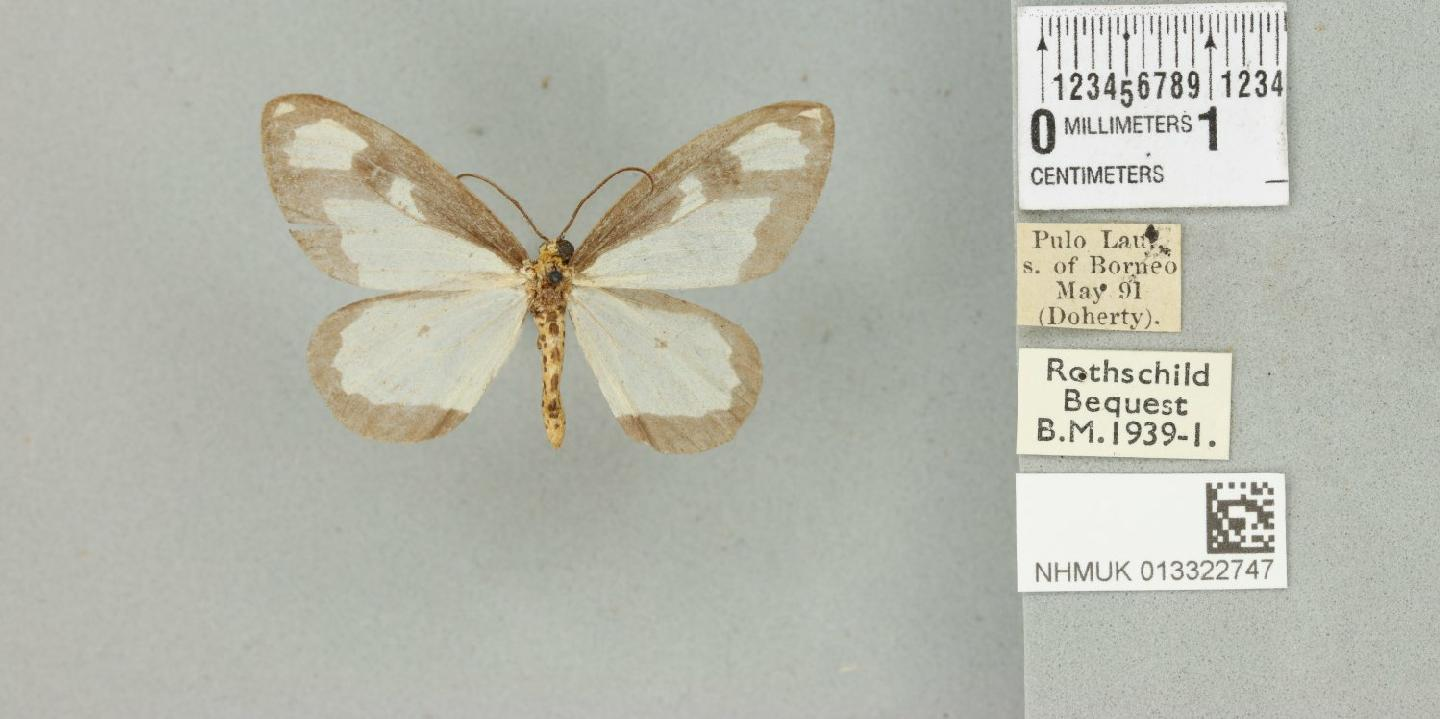

Scientific classification
- Domain: Eukaryota
- Kingdom: Animalia
- Phylum: Arthropoda
- Class: Insecta
- Order: Lepidoptera
- Family: Geometridae
- Genus: Abraxas
- Species: A. subhyalinata

Binomial name
- Abraxas subhyalinata Röber, 1891

Synonyms
- Abraxas discata Warren, 1897

= Abraxas subhyalinata =

Species of moth

Abraxas subhyalinata is a species of moth belonging to the family Geometridae. It was described by Röber in 1891. It is known from Flores and Borneo.
