= Abraxas flavisinuata =

Scientific classification
- Kingdom: Animalia
- Phylum: Arthropoda
- Class: Insecta
- Order: Lepidoptera
- Family: Geometridae
- Genus: Abraxas
- Species: A. flavisinuata

Binomial name
- Abraxas flavisinuata Warren, 1894

Species of moth

Abraxas flavisinuata is a species of moth belonging to the family Geometridae. It was described by William Warren in 1894. It is found in Japan.

The wingspan is 34–44 mm.
