= Abraxas sordida =

Scientific classification
- Kingdom: Animalia
- Phylum: Arthropoda
- Class: Insecta
- Order: Lepidoptera
- Family: Geometridae
- Genus: Abraxas
- Species: A. sordida

Binomial name
- Abraxas sordida Hampson, 1893

Species of moth

Abraxas sordida is a moth of the family Geometridae.
