= Abraxas capitata =

Scientific classification
- Domain: Eukaryota
- Kingdom: Animalia
- Phylum: Arthropoda
- Class: Insecta
- Order: Lepidoptera
- Family: Geometridae
- Genus: Abraxas
- Species: A. capitata

Binomial name
- Abraxas capitata Warren, 1894

Synonyms
- Abraxas intermedia Warren, 1894; Abraxas lobata Hampson, 1895

Species of moth

Abraxas capitata is a species of moth belonging to the family Geometridae. It was described by Warren in 1894. It is known from India (including Himachal Pradesh).
