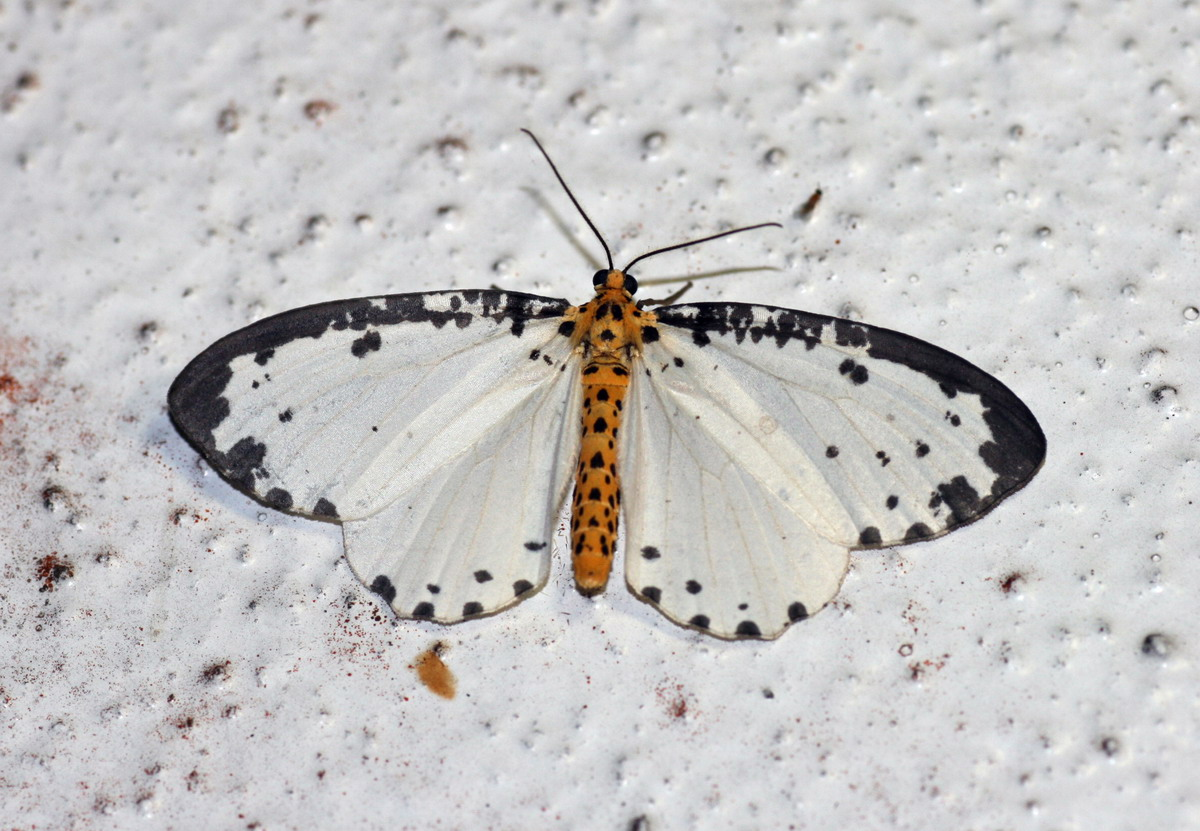

Scientific classification
- Kingdom: Animalia
- Phylum: Arthropoda
- Class: Insecta
- Order: Lepidoptera
- Family: Geometridae
- Genus: Abraxas
- Species: A. incolorata

Binomial name
- Abraxas incolorata Warren, 1894

= Abraxas incolorata =

Species of moth

Abraxas incolorata is a species of moth belonging to the family Geometridae. It was described by Warren in 1894. It is known from Java.
