= Kulturhaus Abraxas =

Cultural institution in Augsburg, Germany

Coordinates: 48.3773°N 10.8681°E

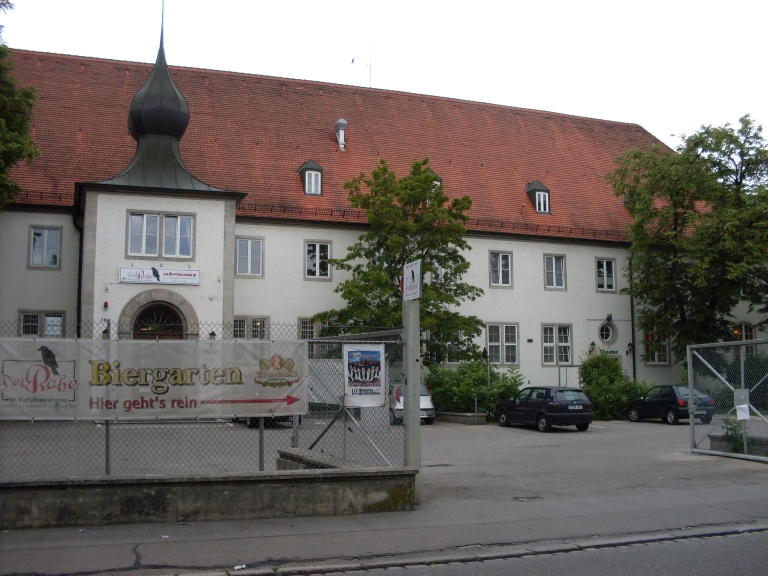
Kulturhaus Abraxas

Kulturhaus Abraxas is a cultural institution of the city of Augsburg. Here, Abraxas is a backronym for Atrium, Bühne, Restaurant, Ateliers, experimentelle Musik in Augsburg an der Sommestraße.

The Reese Barracks was formerly owned by the US forces and became property of the Federal Property Administration. The city of Augsburg rented it in 1995 from the Army and used the former Offizierskasino of the Somme Barracks region as a 'Family Recreation Center', building a cultural center with a 150-seat theater, an exhibition hall, studios, music practice rooms, and a restaurant.

Since January 1996, the cultural center's program has mainly featured music, especially jazz, and also theater, demonstrations, and exhibitions. Since February 1998, the Federal Association of Visual Artists has also been located in the office of Abraxas and uses the exhibition hall. The yearly Lab.30 media art festival takes place at Abraxas.
