= Sula Island =

Island in Albay, Philippines

Sula
- Location within Albay Location within Luzon Location within Philippines

Geography
- Coordinates: 13°16′15.8″N 123°49′48.9″E
- Adjacent to: Lagonoy Gulf; Philippine Sea

Administration
- Philippines
- Region: Bicol Region
- Province: Albay
- Municipality: Bacacay

Additional information

Sula Island is an island located in the Albay province of the Philippines.

== See also ==
- List of islands of the Philippines
