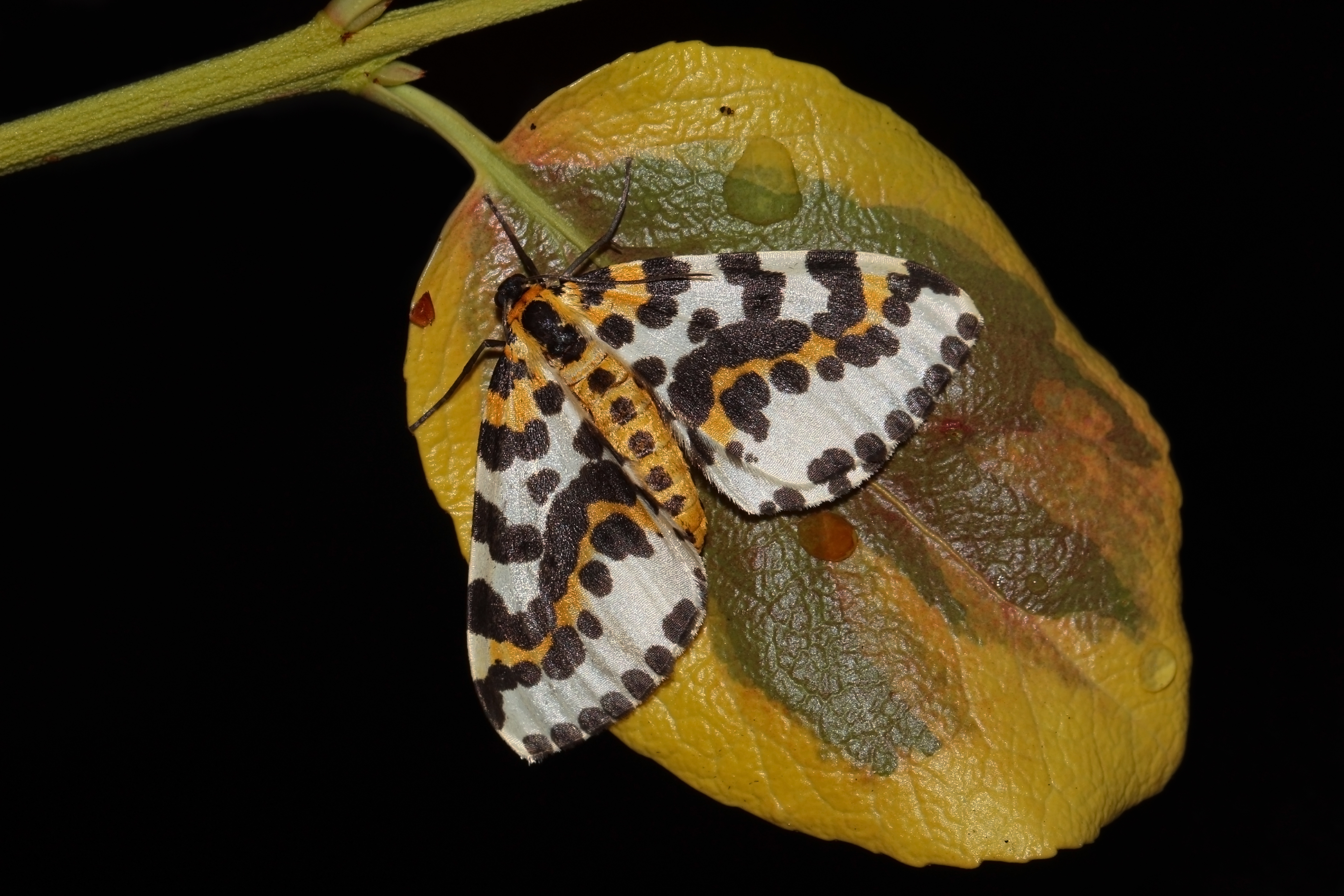
- In Oxford, England

Scientific classification
- Kingdom: Animalia
- Phylum: Arthropoda
- Clade: Pancrustacea
- Class: Insecta
- Order: Lepidoptera
- Family: Geometridae
- Genus: Abraxas
- Species: A. grossulariata

Binomial name
- Abraxas grossulariata (Linnaeus, 1758)

Synonyms
- Abraxas karafutonis Matsumura, 1925; Abraxas grossulariatus (Linnaeus, 1758)

= Abraxas grossulariata =

Magpie moth

Species of moth

Abraxas grossulariata is a moth of the family Geometridae, native to the Palearctic realm and North America. Its distinctive speckled coloration has given it a common name of magpie moth. The caterpillar is similarly coloured to the adult, and may be found feeding on the leaves of shrubs such as gooseberry and blackcurrant. The species was first described by Carl Linnaeus in his 1758 10th edition of Systema Naturae.

== Description ==
The length of the forewing is 18–25 mm. The strikingly patterned forewings have a white ground colour, with six transverse series of black stains, partly associated with a pale yellow basal cross band and another through the central area of the forewing. The hindwings are paler, and have a few, small dark stains.

It is a highly variable species with many different forms. Research using Abraxas grossulariata led to the discovery of sex-linked characteristics.

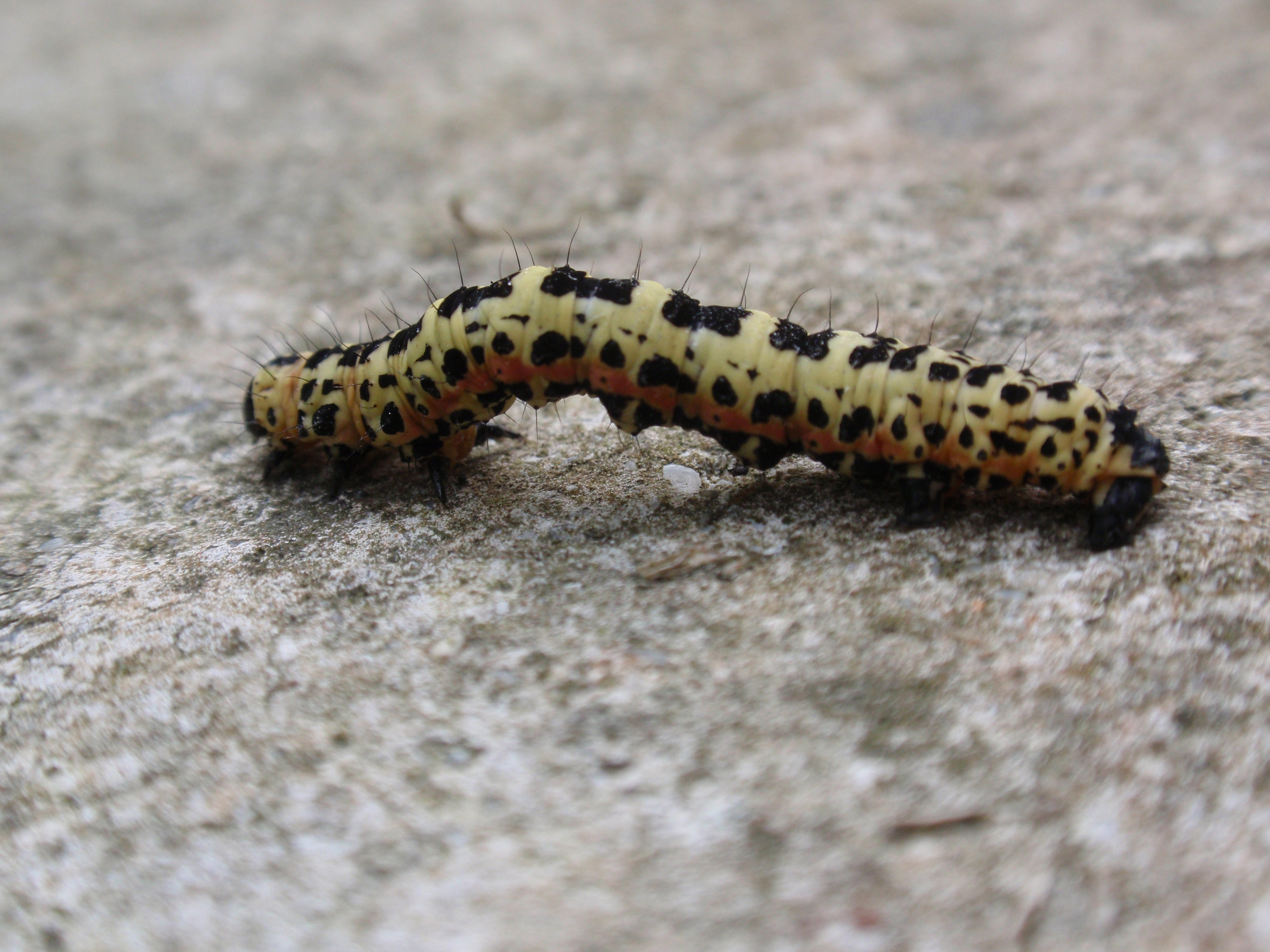
Larva

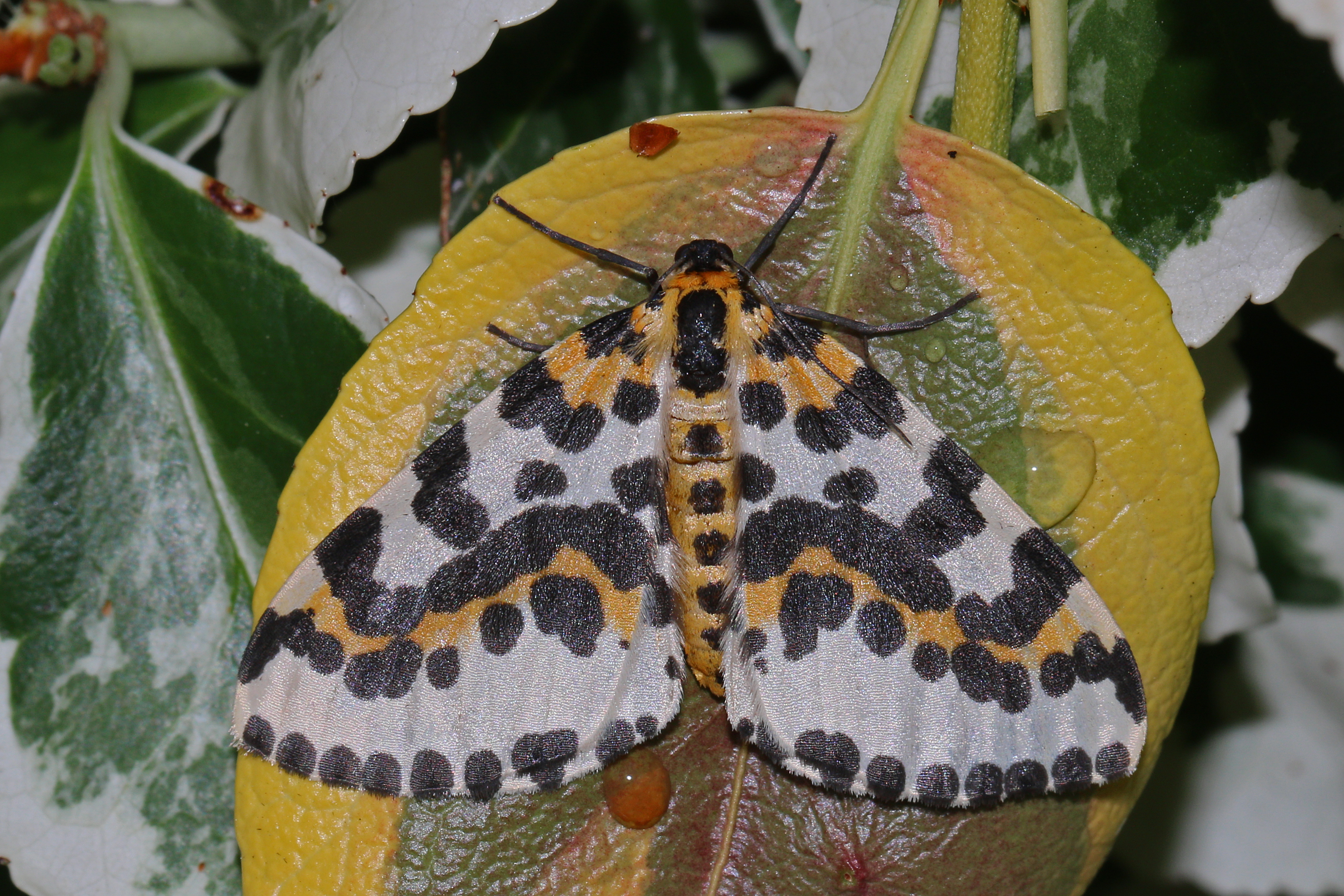

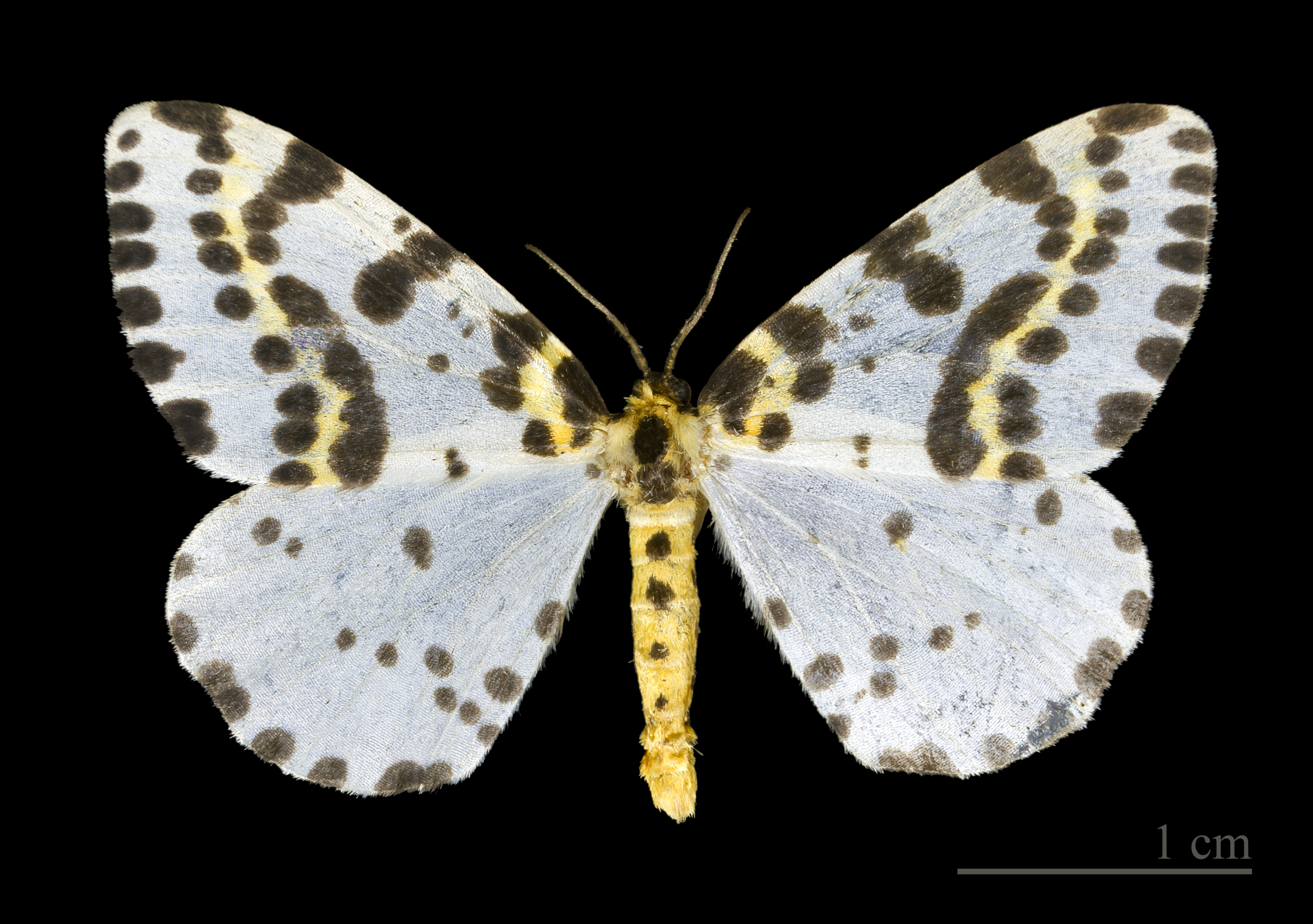
Mounted specimen

== Subspecies ==
- Abraxas grossulariata grossulariata
- Abraxas grossulariata karafutonis Matsumura, 1925 (Sakhalin)
- Abraxas grossulariata conspurcata Butler, 1878 (Japan)
- Abraxas grossulariata dsungarica Wehrli, 1939 (Dzungaria)

== Recorded foodplants ==
- Ribes rubrum
- Ribes nigrum
- Prunus spinosa
- Crataegus
- Corylus
- Euonymus europaeus
- Salix
