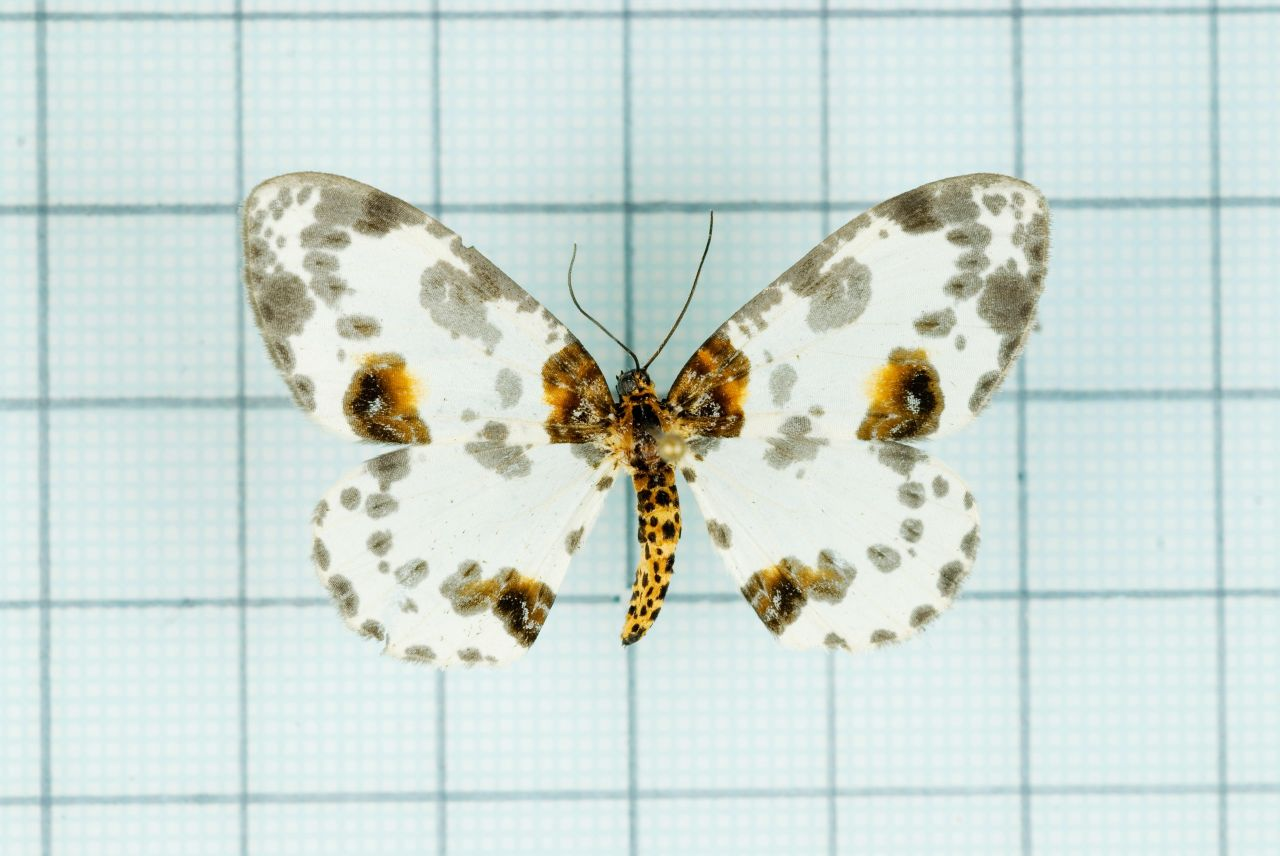

Scientific classification
- Kingdom: Animalia
- Phylum: Arthropoda
- Class: Insecta
- Order: Lepidoptera
- Family: Geometridae
- Tribe: Abraxini
- Genus: Abraxas; Leach, 1815

Synonyms
- Spilote Hübner, [1806]; Spilota Hübner, 1818; Zerene Treitschke, 1825; Calospilos Hübner, [1825]; Callispilus Agassiz, 1847; Potera Moore, [1879]; Omophyseta Warren, 1894; Silabraxas Swinhoe, 1900; Chooreechillum Lucas, 1901; Dextridens Wehrli, 1934; Isostictia Wehrli, 1934; Diceratodesia Wehrli, 1935; Mesohypoleuca Wehrli, 1935; Rhabdotaedoeagus Wehrli, 1935; Spinuncus Wehrli, 1935; Trimeresia Wehrli, 1935

= Abraxas (moth) =

Genus of geometer moths

Abraxas, the magpie moths, is a genus of moths in the family Geometridae. It was first described by William Elford Leach in 1815.

== Description ==
Palpi porrect (extending forward) and roughly scaled. Hind tibia of male dilated with a fold containing a tuft of hair. Forewings with vein 3 from before angle of cell and veins 7, 8, 9 and 10, 11 stalked. Vein 11 becoming coincident with vein 12, or apparently absent. Hindwings with vein 3 from before angle of cell.

== Species ==
The genus includes the following species:

- Abraxas adilluminata Inoue, 1984
- Abraxas albiplaga (Warren, 1894)
- Abraxas albiquadrata (Warren, 1897)
- Abraxas antinebulosa Inoue, 1984
- Abraxas breueri Stüning & Hausmann, 2002
- Abraxas capitata Warren, 1894
- Abraxas celidota Wehrli, 1931
- Abraxas consputa Bastelberger, 1909
- Abraxas cupreilluminata Inoue, 1984
- Abraxas degener Warren, 1894
- Abraxas disrupta Warren, 1894
- Abraxas expectata Warren, 1902
- Abraxas flavimacula (Warren, 1896)
- Abraxas flavisinuata Warren, 1894
- Abraxas fletcheri Inoue, 1984
- Abraxas formosilluminata Inoue, 1984
- Abraxas fulvobasalis Warren, 1894
- Abraxas gephyra West, 1929
- Abraxas grossulariata (Linnaeus, 1758) – magpie
- Abraxas illuminata Warren, 1894
- Abraxas incolorata Warren, 1894
- Abraxas intermedia Warren, 1888
- Abraxas interpunctata Warren, 1905
- Abraxas intervacuata (Warren, 1896)
- Abraxas invasata Warren, 1897
- Abraxas karafutonis Matsumura, 1925
- Abraxas labraria Guenée, 1857
- Abraxas latifasciata Warren, 1894
- Abraxas leucostola Hampson, 1893
- Abraxas martaria Guenée, 1857
- Abraxas membranacea Warren, 1894
- Abraxas metamorpha Warren, 1893
- Abraxas miranda Butler, 1878
- Abraxas niphonibia Wehrli, 1935
- Abraxas notata Warren, 1894
- Abraxas pantaria (Linnaeus, 1767) – light magpie
- Abraxas parvimiranda Inoue, 1984
- Abraxas paucinotata Warren, 1894
- Abraxas persimplex Inoue, 1984
- Abraxas picaria Moore, [1868]
- Abraxas placata Inoue, 1984
- Abraxas privata Bastelberger, 1905
- Abraxas punctifera (Walker, [1865])
- Abraxas pusilla Butler, 1880
- Abraxas satoi Inoue, 1972
- Abraxas sinopicaria Wehrli, 1934
- Abraxas sordida Hampson, 1893
- Abraxas sporocrossa Turner, 1922
- Abraxas stictotaenia Wehrli, 1932
- Abraxas stresemanni Rothschild, 1915
- Abraxas subhyalinata Röber, 1891
- Abraxas submartiaria Wehrli, 1932
- Abraxas suffusa Warren, 1894
- Abraxas suspecta (Warren, 1894)
- Abraxas sylvata (Scopoli, 1763) – clouded magpie
- Abraxas symmetrica Warren, 1894
- Abraxas taiwanensis Inoue, 1984
- Abraxas tenellula Inoue, 1984
- Abraxas tenuisuffusa Inoue, 1984
- Abraxas triseriaria Herrich-Schäffer, [1855]
- Abraxas wilemani Inoue, 1984
