= Antunes =

Antunes is a Portuguese surname, of patronymic origin meaning "son of Anthony (António)". The Spanish variant is Antúnez or Antunez. Notable people with the surname include:

== Politics ==
- Cármen Lúcia Antunes Rocha (born 1954), Justice of the Supreme Federal Court of Brazil
- João do Canto e Castro Antunes (1862–1934), President of Portugal 1918–1919
- Manuel Antunes Frasquilho (died 2015), Portuguese politician
- Ernesto Melo Antunes (1933–1999), Portuguese politician and general
- Manuel Lobo Antunes (born 1958), current Portuguese Ambassador to the United Kingdom

== Business ==
- Helder Antunes (born 1963), Portuguese Silicon Valley executive and former racecar driver
- Miguel Antunes Frasquilho (born 1967), Portuguese chairman of TAP Air Portugal

== Academics ==
- João Lobo Antunes (1944–2016), Portuguese neurosurgeon
- José Antunes Sobrinho (born 1962), Brazilian civil engineer and energy executive
- Miguel Telles Antunes (born 1937), Portuguese paleontologist
- Sandy Antunes (born 1967), American astronomer and writer

== Arts ==
- António Lobo Antunes (1942–2026), Portuguese writer and psychiatrist
- Arnaldo Antunes (born 1960), Brazilian writer and composer
- Celso Antunes (born 1959), Brazilian conductor
- João Antunes (1642–1712), Portuguese Baroque architect
- Jorge Antunes (composer) (born 1942), Brazilian composer
- Jorge Antunes (actor) (born 1972), Angolan actor and TV host
- Michael Antunes (1940–2025), American saxophonist
- Antunes harpsichord family, 18th century Portuguese harpsichord makers

== Athletics ==
- Anderson Andrade Antunes (born 1981), Brazilian footballer
- Arthur Antunes Coimbra (born 1953), Brazilian footballer and coach
- Macaris Antunes do Livramento (born 1960), Brazilian boxer
- Talita Antunes (born 1982), Brazilian beach volleyball player
- Vitorino Antunes (born 1987), Portuguese footballer

== See also ==
- Jorge Antunes, a sports club based in Vizela, Portugal
