= Fog computing =

Architecture that uses edge devices

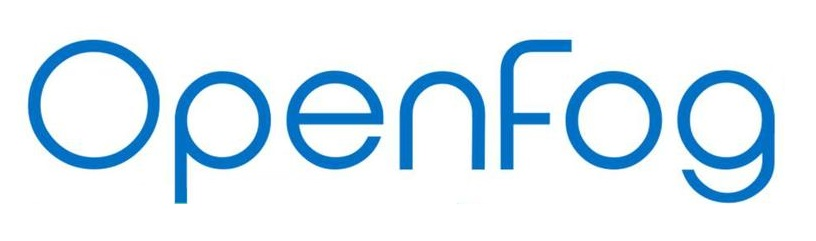
The OpenFog Consortium was an association of major tech companies aimed at standardizing and promoting fog computing.

Fog computing or fog networking, also known as fogging, is an architecture that uses edge devices to carry out a substantial amount of computation (edge computing), storage, and communication locally and routed over the Internet backbone.

== Concept ==
In 2011, the need to extend cloud computing with fog computing emerged, in order to cope with huge number of IoT (Internet of Things) devices and big data volumes for real-time low-latency applications. Fog computing, much like edge computing, is intended for distributed computing where numerous "peripheral" devices connect to a cloud. The word "fog" refers to its cloud-like properties, but closer to the "ground", i.e. IoT devices. Many of these devices will generate voluminous raw data (e.g., from sensors), and rather than forward all this data to cloud-based servers to be processed, the idea behind fog computing is to do as much processing as possible using computing units co-located with the data-generating devices, so that processed rather than raw data is forwarded, and bandwidth requirements are reduced. An additional benefit is that the processed data is most likely to be needed by the same devices that generated the data, so that by processing locally rather than remotely, the latency between input and response is minimized. This idea is not entirely new: in non-cloud-computing scenarios, special-purpose hardware (e.g., signal-processing chips performing fast Fourier transforms) has long been used to reduce latency and reduce the burden on a CPU.

Fog networking consists of a control plane and a data plane. For example, on the data plane, fog computing enables computing services to reside at the edge of the network as opposed to servers in a data-center. Compared to cloud computing, fog computing emphasizes proximity to end-users and client objectives (e.g. operational costs, security policies, resource exploitation), dense geographical distribution and context-awareness (for what concerns computational and IoT resources), latency reduction and backbone bandwidth savings to achieve better quality of service and edge analytics/stream mining, resulting in superior user-experience and redundancy in case of failure while it is also able to be used in Assisted Living scenarios.

Fog networking supports the Internet of Things (IoT) concept, in which most of the devices used by humans on a daily basis will be connected to each other. Examples include phones, wearable health monitoring devices, connected vehicle and augmented reality using devices such as the Google Glass. IoT devices are often resource-constrained and have limited computational abilities to perform cryptography computations. A fog node can provide security for IoT devices by performing these cryptographic computations instead.

SPAWAR, a division of the US Navy, is prototyping and testing a scalable, secure Disruption Tolerant Mesh Network to protect strategic military assets, both stationary and mobile. Machine-control applications, running on the mesh nodes, "take over", when Internet connectivity is lost. Use cases include Internet of Things e.g. smart drone swarms.

The University of Melbourne is addressing the challenges of collecting and processing data from cameras, ECG devices, laptops, smartphones, and IoT devices with its project FogBus 2, which uses edge/fog and Oracle Cloud Infrastructure to process data in real-time.

ISO/IEC 20248 provides a method whereby the data of objects identified by edge computing using Automated Identification Data Carriers (AIDC), a barcode and/or RFID tag, can be read, interpreted, verified and made available into the "Fog" and on the "Edge," even when the AIDC tag has moved on.

== History ==
The term "fog computing" was first developed by Cisco in 2012. November 19, 2015, Cisco Systems, ARM Holdings, Dell, Intel, Microsoft, and Princeton University, founded the OpenFog Consortium to promote interests and development in fog computing. Cisco Sr. Managing-Director Helder Antunes became the consortium's first chairman and Intel's Chief IoT Strategist Jeff Fedders became its first president.

== Definition ==
Both cloud computing and fog computing provide storage, applications, and data to end-users. However, fog computing is closer to end-users and has wider geographical distribution.

'Cloud computing' is the practice of using a network of remote servers hosted on the Internet to store, manage, and process data, rather than a local server or a personal computer.

Also known as edge computing or fogging, fog computing facilitates the operation of compute, storage, and networking services between end devices and cloud computing data centers.

National Institute of Standards and Technology in March 2018 released a definition of fog computing adopting much of Cisco's commercial terminology as NIST Special Publication 500-325, Fog Computing Conceptual Model, that defines fog computing as a horizontal, physical or virtual resource paradigm that resides between smart end-devices and traditional cloud computing or data center. This paradigm supports vertically-isolated, latency-sensitive applications by providing ubiquitous, scalable, layered, federated, distributed computing, storage, and network connectivity. Thus, fog computing is most distinguished by distance from the edge. In the theoretical model of fog computing, fog computing nodes are physically and functionally operative between edge nodes and centralized cloud. Much of the terminology is undefined, including key architectural terms like "smart", and the distinction between fog computing from edge computing is not generally agreed.

=== Differences from edge computing ===
While edge computing is typically referred to the location where services are instantiated, fog computing implies distribution of the communication, computation, storage resources, and services on or close to devices and systems in the control of end-users. Fog computing is a medium weight and intermediate level of computing power. Rather than a substitute, fog computing often serves as a complement to cloud computing. Fog computing is more energy-efficient than cloud computing.

== Standards ==
IEEE adopted the fog computing standards proposed by OpenFog Consortium.

== See also ==
- Fog robotics
- Edge computing
- Dew computing
- Mobile edge computing
- OpenFog Consortium
