= Helder Antunes =

Portuguese businessperson (born 1963)

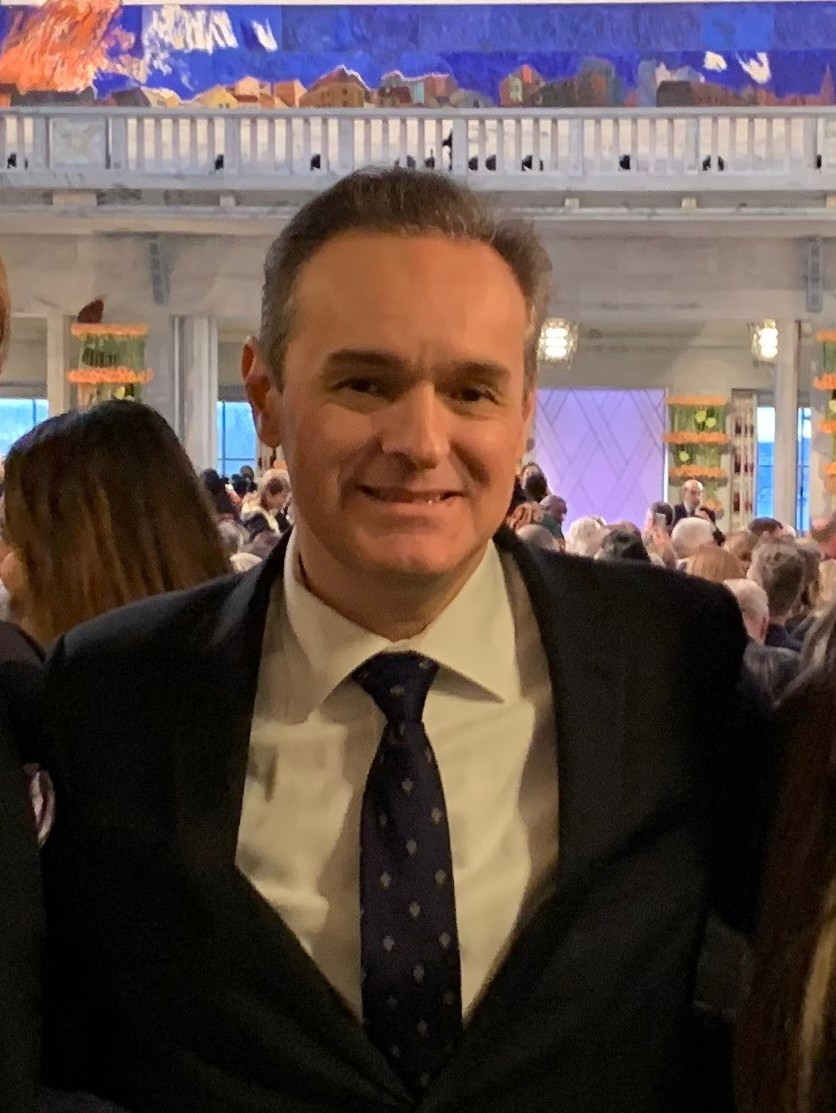
- Antunes at the Nobel Peace Price ceremony in Oslo, Norway; 2018.
- Born: Hélder Manuel da Terra Fragueiro Marques Antunes; Angra do Heroísmo, Azores, Portugal
- Citizenship: Portuguese Republic; United States of America
- Education: San Jose State University; Georgetown University
- Known for: CEO of Crowdkeep; Founder and former Chairman of the OpenFog Consortium; Former Cisco executive; Senior Advisor at Armilar Venture Partners; Advisor to the Government of the Portuguese Republic
- Website: www.helderantunes.com

Hélder Fragueiro Antunes (born 6 July 1963) is a Portuguese-American executive, computer scientist, entrepreneur, and former racecar driver. A Cisco Systems executive for over twenty years, as well as founder and first Chairman of the OpenFog Consortium, Antunes is currently the chief revenue officer of Veea. His car racing career in the 1980s and '90s made him one of the most preeminent open road racers at the time.

Dubbed by PortugalGlobal Magazine as "the perfect example of Portuguese success in the global era", Antunes is involved in Portuguese and Azorean economic and political affairs. Antunes frequently is a lobbyist for Portuguese interests in Silicon Valley, through institutions like the AICEP Portugal Global and Rede Prestige Açores, and is an advisor to the Government of Portugal and the Azores.

== Early life ==
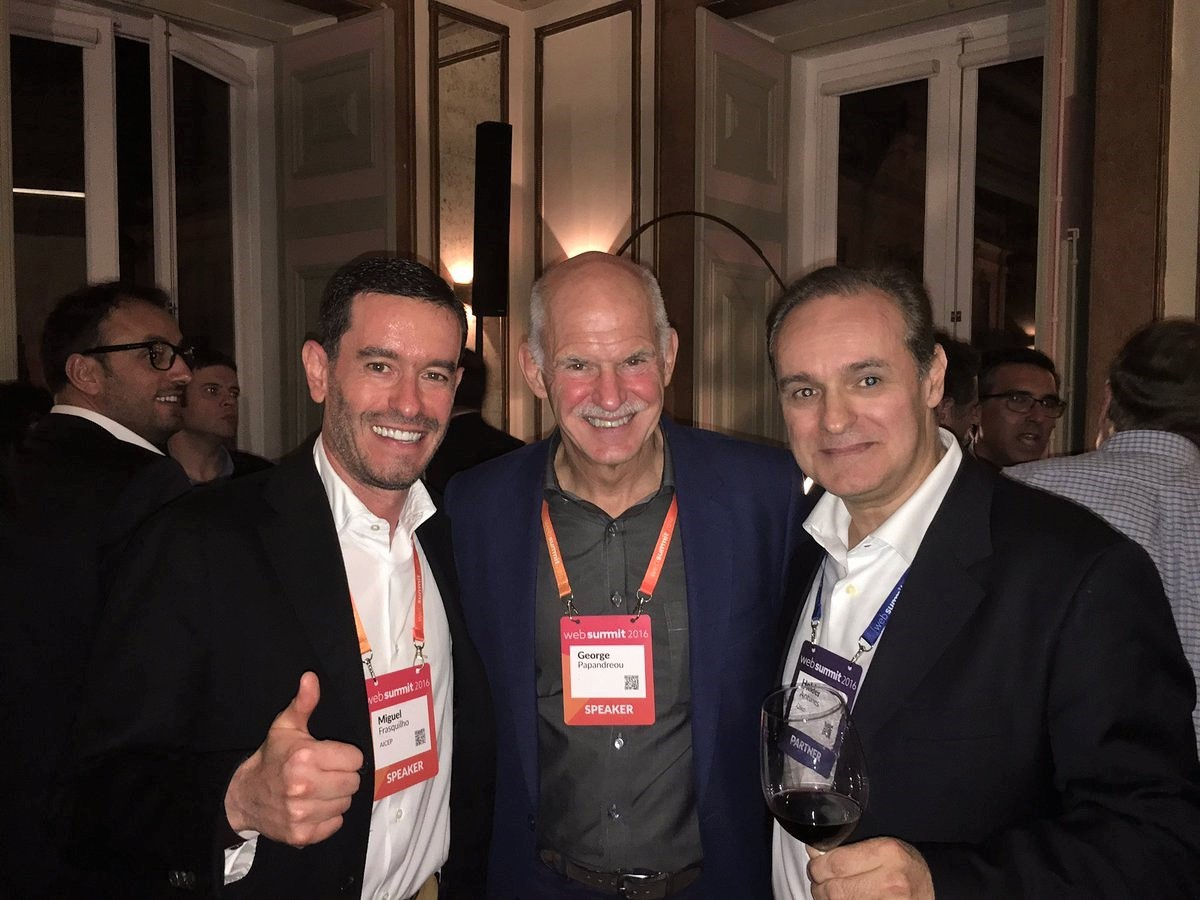
Antunes (right) with George Papandreou, former Prime Minister of Greece (center), and cousin Miguel Antunes Frasquilho, TAP Portugal chairman (left); Web Summit, 2016.

Hélder Manuel da Terra Fragueiro Marques Antunes was born on 6 July 1963 in Angra do Heroísmo, Terceira Island, Azores, to Armando Manuel Marques Antunes, an avionics and aerospace scientist from Torres Novas, and Carolina Bettencourt de Vasconcelos da Terra Fragueiro, a member of the Bettencourt family from Horta, Azores. Through his mother, Antunes is a descendant of Flemish explorers Willem van der Haegen and Josse van Huerter and related to 19th century Portuguese prime-minister, Ernesto Hintze Ribeiro. Through his father, Antunes is cousin to Miguel Antunes Frasquilho, current chairman of the Board of TAP Portugal and Portuguese politician, and nephew to Manuel Antunes Frasquilho, former President of the Port of Lisbon and the Lisbon Metro. RTP journalist Pedro Bicudo described Antunes's parents as a "very well-known couple throughout the Azores".

Antunes spent his early life at the Lajes Air Force Base, on Terceira, when much of his family served in the Portuguese Air Force, per family tradition. His family moved to Ponta Delgada, on São Miguel Island, in 1967, when Antunes's father moved to the private sector (SATA Air Açores). Antunes and his family stayed on the island until 1975, when the events following the Carnation Revolution motivated them to emigrate to Rhode Island in the United States.

Helder Antunes

Car Racing Career
- Years active: 1993-2002
- Teams: Ford Performance Solutions
- Best finish: 1st in 1993-1995, 1998, 2000, 2002

Previous series
- N.A.S.A. CMC (1999-2002); Rodger Ward's Pony Express 100 (1996-2002); C.A.R.S. Gamber's Run Twin 50 (1998-2000); N.A.S.A. Inaugural Season (1995); C.A.R.S. Silver State 100 BluBlocker (1993-94); Nevada Open Road Challenge (1992); Silver State Classic Challenge (1990-96)

Awards
- Best Performance - 1998 Pony Express 100

Antunes lived in Rhode Island until 1983, when his family moved to San Jose, California, because Antunes's father was offered a position at aerospace and defense giant Lockheed Martin, where he would later work on the Hubble Space Telescope project. Once in California, Antunes and his father took over the management and modernization of The Portuguese Tribune, a bilingual California-based newspaper serving the Luso-American diaspora.

=== Racing career ===
Antunes started professional auto racing in 1983, shortly after his move to California. By 1987, Antunes had participated multiple times in the Nevada Open Road Challenge and the Silver State Classic, considered by Guinness World Records as the fastest road race in the world.

During his early years, Antunes raced Ford Mustangs and Chevrolet Corvettes at tracks such as Sonoma Raceway (then known as Sears Point Raceway) and Laguna Seca Raceway. Over the years, Antunes placed in the top 3 various times in the Pony Express 100.

During his time as an automotive racer, Antunes designed some of the earliest data acquisition systems for racecars. His systems pioneered the integration of a car's computerized engine controls with real-time data acquisition and modeling, including the development of an engine "black box" aimed at converting engine data to be transmitted to a racecar's support team.

== Silicon Valley ==
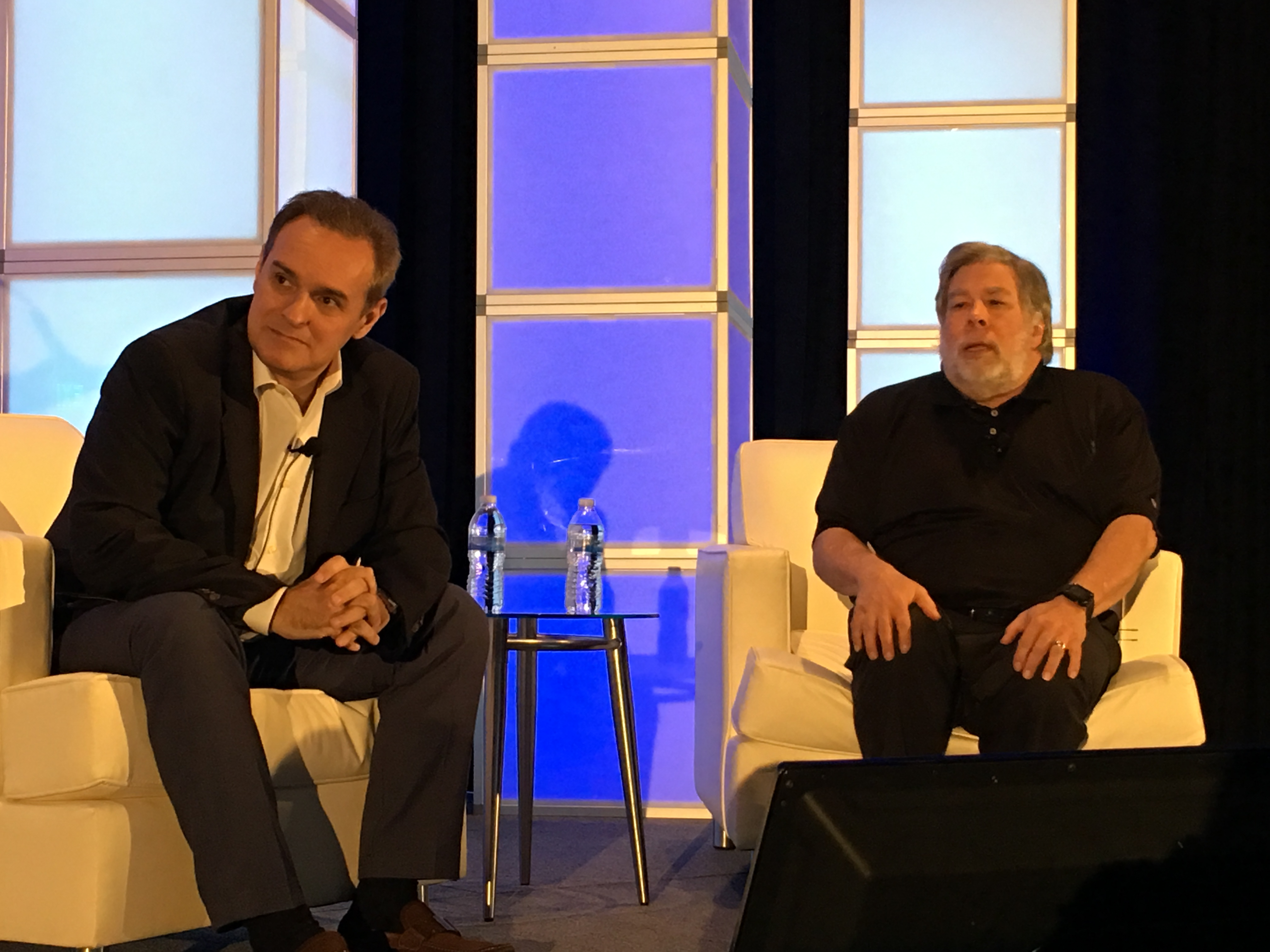
Antunes and Apple co-founder Steve Wozniak at Fog World Congress 2018.

Antunes started his career in the Silicon Valley high-tech industry at Grid Systems Corporation as a support engineer, where he first met John Morgridge, CEO and Chairman of Cisco. After Grid Systems, Antunes went to work at Plus Development and two years later at CA Technologies, where he led the CA-Superproject. Following CA, Antunes worked for NetManage, as Director of Engineering.

Antunes was a General Partner at PVentures, a Silicon Valley–high-tech consulting firm. Portuguese newspaper Expresso stated that Antunes and Perreira wanted to "transform good ideas from entrepreneurs [in Portugal] into successful businesses [in Silicon Valley]".

Since starting his links between Silicon Valley and Portugal, Antunes had long stated the necessity of a Portuguese lobby in Silicon Valley, stating "Portugal needs to have an entity with its feet well-dipped in Silicon Valley." Antunes stated that, with a lobby, "Portuguese technological businesses could be contracted... through outsourcing." Antunes was eventually able to start a coalition of Portuguese businessmen in Silicon Valley and establish a Portuguese lobby.

In April 2016, Antunes became a member of the board of directors of Veniam, a company specialized in WiFi mesh networks.

In 2017, Antunes became a member of the board of directors of GDS 360 and in 2018, Antunes became the CEO of the company, rebranded as CyVolve.

=== Cisco Systems ===
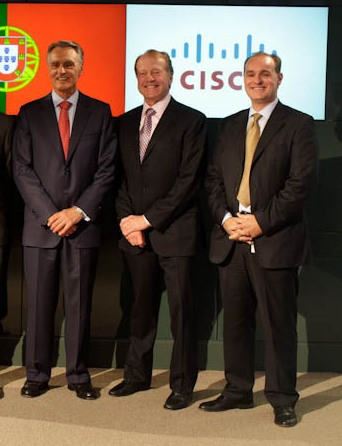
President of Portugal Cavaco Silva, Cisco CEO John Chambers, and Antunes during the 2011 presidential visit to the USA.

Antunes joined Cisco Systems in 1998 as Senior Manager of Engineering, focusing on embedding security protocols into Cisco IOS. In 2003, Antunes was promoted to Director of Engineering, Global Solutions, and Network Services. Antunes and his team's work on the Dynamic Multipoint Virtual Private Network (DMVPN) earned them the 2004 Cisco Pioneer Award.

From January 2012 to December 2013, Antunes was managing director of the Cisco IoT Group and directed the Smart Connected Vehicles Initiative, a part of the Connected Industries Group, which seeks to network vehicles and standardize on the underlying networking platform.

Since 2013, Antunes has been Senior Director of Corporate Strategic Innovation, with the intent to resolve market disruptions, identify and foster innovative initiatives, and conduct Cisco's market strategy and leadership in IT.

=== IoT and OpenFog ===
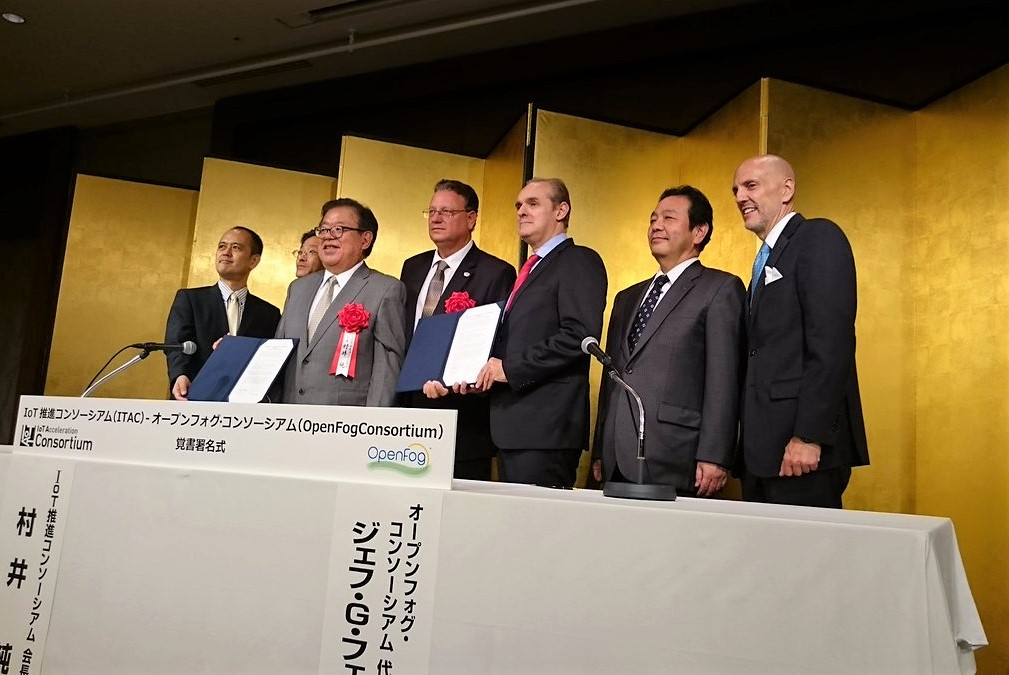
Antunes and Openfog leadership signing an agreement with the Japanese Ministry of Economy, Trade, and Industry (METI) in Tokyo, 2016.

In February 2013, Antunes was a founding member of the Internet of Things World Forum Steering Committee, which "aims to accelerate innovation, inspire new ways to transform governments, industries and lives."

Antunes was a keynote speaker at the NASA-sponsored conference held at Ames Research Center, in July 2015, concerning the development of air regulations for drones. Antunes stressed the role of drones in the future of the Internet of Things, which Antunes is actively involved in through Cisco.

In November 2015, Antunes co-founded and was elected as chairman of the board of directors for the newly formed OpenFog Consortium, a consortium founded by tech giants Microsoft, Cisco, Dell, Intel, ARM Holdings, and Princeton University, for the standardization and promotion of fog computing. The idea for fog computing consortium was thought up by Antunes, alongside Mung Chiang, then a Princeton University professor and now Dean of the Purdue University College of Engineering, and Tao Zhang, CIO of the IEEE Communications Society.

Antunes was unanimously reelected as OpenFog Chairman in September 2017.

Antunes was a member of the Fog World Congress 2017 Steering Committee and a keynote speaker at the inaugural Fog World Congress in Santa Clara, California.

In 2018, Antunes was listed in the inaugural EDGE 50, naming the world's top 50 influencers in edge computing.

== Activity in Portugal ==
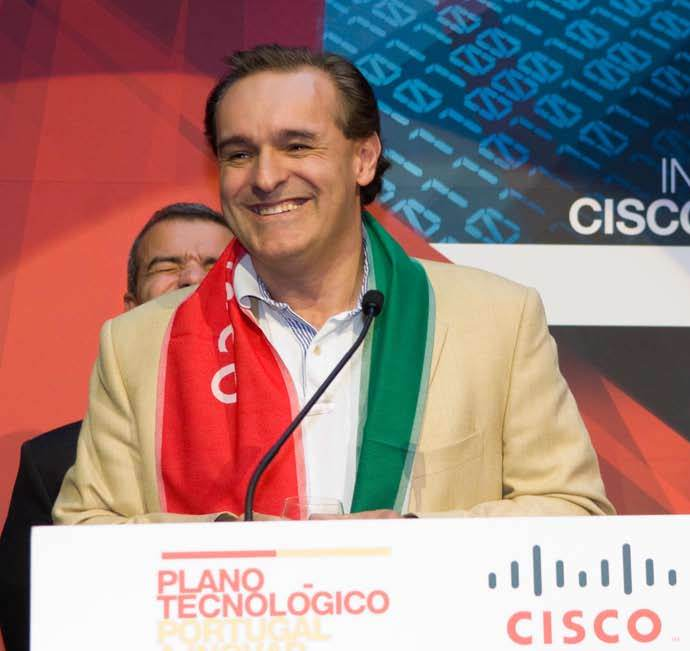
Antunes speaking at the 2008 inauguration of Cisco Portugal.

Antunes has played an important role in tying AICEP's INOV Contacto Program with Silicon Valley, with a strong emphasis on Cisco Systems. This program, which is mostly funded by the Portuguese government and European Union, takes recent university graduates from Portugal and trains them in international business and technology.

Antunes has been cited as an important person behind the installation of Cisco Systems in Portugal. Antunes was a key member in establishing the Cisco laboratory in Portugal and Cisco Portugal as a whole.

Antunes's work in connecting Portuguese students and businesses to Silicon Valley has earned him a reputation in Portugal as being an "ambassador of Portugal", a "true consul of Portugal in California", an "importer of talents", and a "consul of Portugal in Cisco".

In 2018, Antunes became Senior Advisor to Armilar Venture Partners, a Portuguese venture capital firm.

=== In the Azores ===
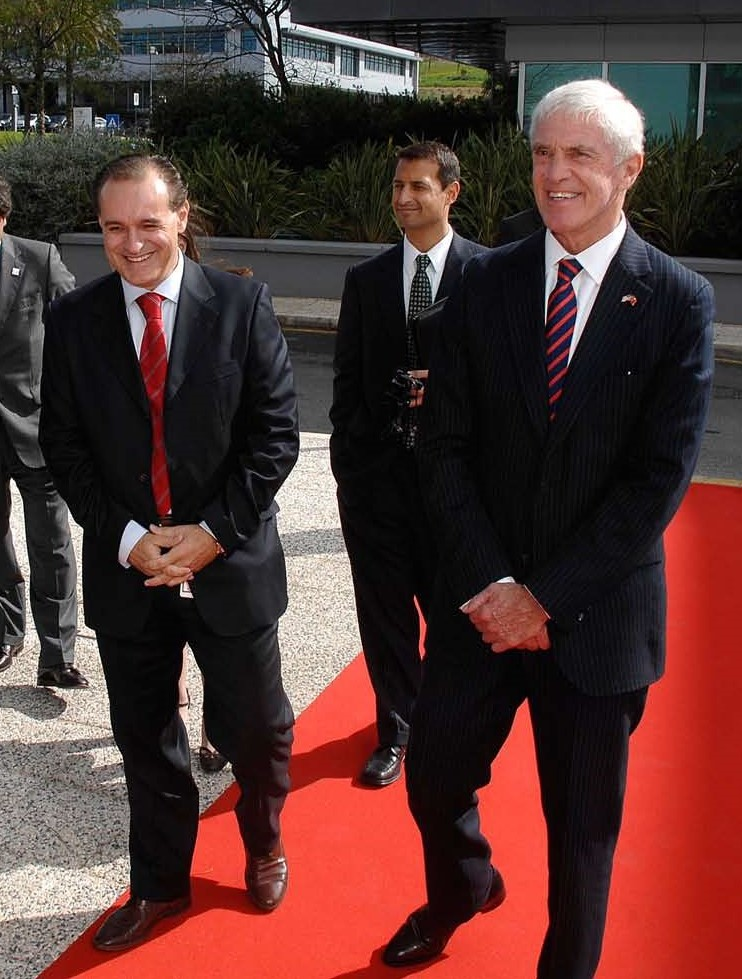
Helder Antunes and then U.S. Ambassador to Portugal, Thomas F. Stephenson; 2008.

Alongside INOV Contacto's program, Antunes also formed a similar program in conjunction with the Regional Government of the Azores, which works exclusively with Azorean university students and hosts them at Antunes's department at Cisco Systems headquarters in San Jose, California.

He worked with Armando Pereira, Antunes often assist in the collaboration of businesses in Silicon Valley with start-ups within the tech industry and otherwise in the Azores.

Antunes has long stressed the importance of the creation of an Azorean lobby, stating that the "creation of a formal lobby with the structure to foster innovating ideas from Portugal could expose them to the global market." The creation of a lobby in the Azores, according to Antunes, would allow the Azorean market to be open to the "authorities of foreign investment" and establish "contacts with the right people."

Antunes is a counselor to the Rede Prestige Açores, a network of notable Azoreans hosted by the Azorean government with the intent of development and knowledge dissemination for the benefit of the Azores.

In 2012, Antunes was included in a list, compiled by the Regional Government of the Azores, of the Most Notable People from the Azores.

== Personal life ==
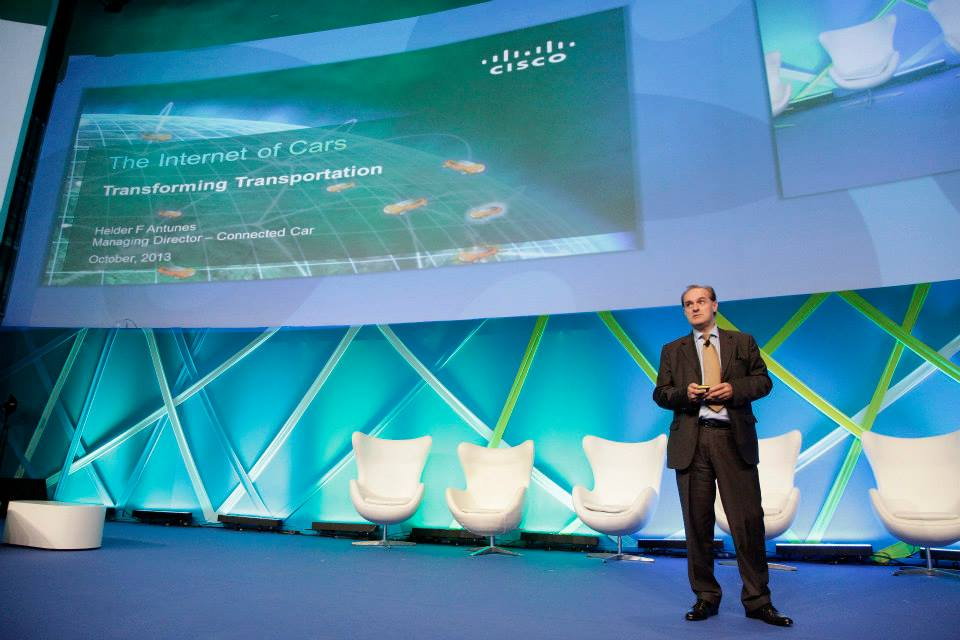
Antunes speaking on Internet of Things at Cisco Connect 2013.

He has three children: Francesca Alexandria, Christian Thomas, and Giancarlo. Antunes resides between Washington, D.C., and Sintra, on the Portuguese Riviera.

=== Honours ===
In 2012, Antunes was included in a list, called the National Selection, compiled by Revista Prémio, which listed the most powerful and influential Portuguese executives around the world and called Antunes "the guardian angel of Uncle Sam."

Antunes is included in a list, compiled by the Regional Government of the Azores, of the Most Notable People from the Azores, listing internationally recognized and noteworthy Azoreans.

Awards

Awards received by Antunes include:

- 2012 COTEC Portuguese Diaspora Entrepreneurial Innovation Award
- 2012 Cisco Winnovation Challenge Honourable Mention
- 2008 CIO 100 Award
- 2004 Cisco Pioneer Award in Technological Innovation
- 2003 Cisco Teamwork of the Year Award

Medals

- Medal of Honour of the Municipality of Melgaço
- Medal of Honour of the Municipality of Oeiras

== Published works ==
- DMVPN Extends Business Ready Teleworker
- Cisco on Cisco Best Practices Cisco Remote Access Design: Cisco Virtual Office Solution
- Smart Connected Vehicles – Changing How We Drive
