= Miguel Frasquilho =

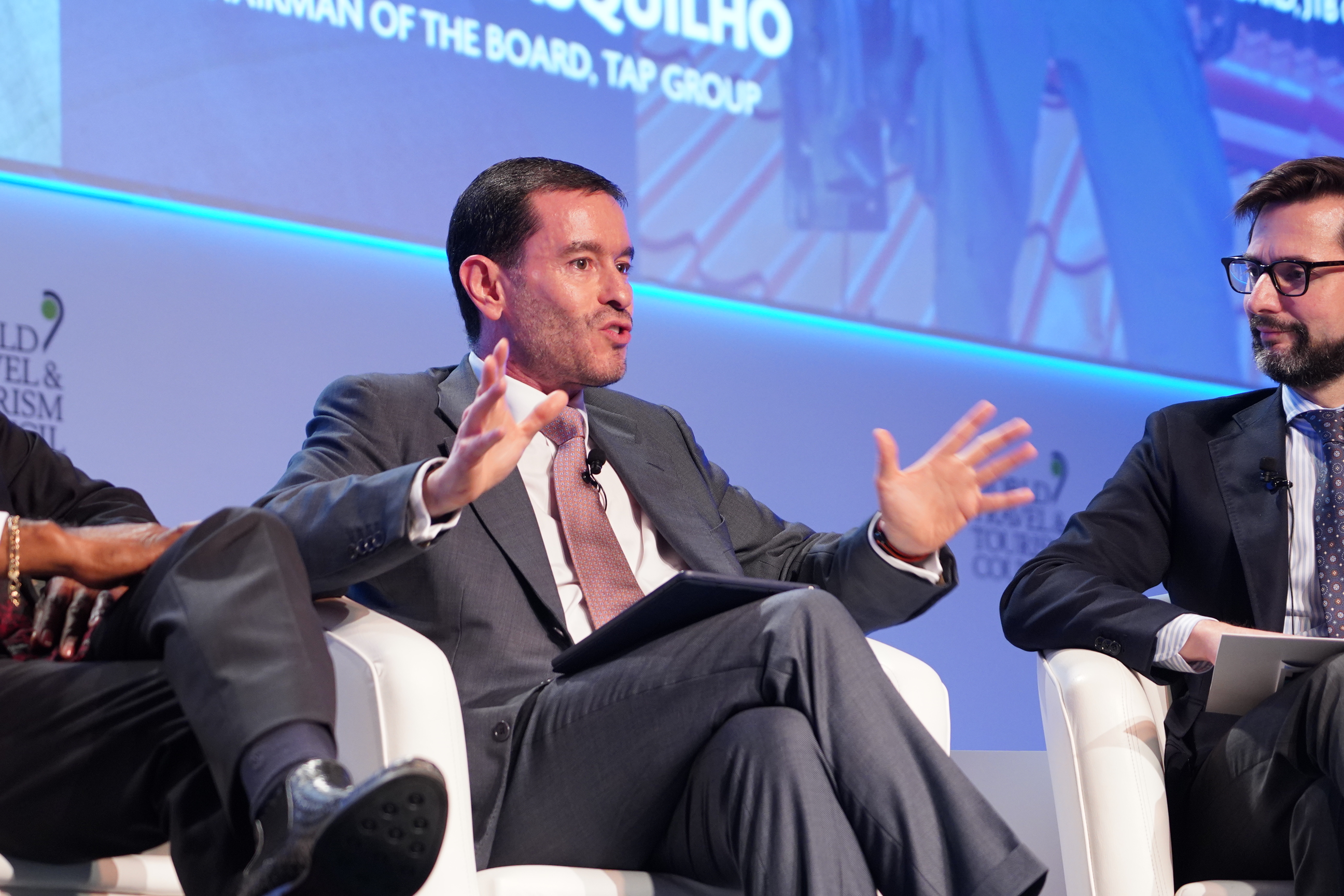
- Frasquilho speaking at the 2018 World Travel and Tourism Council Summit

Chairman of TAP Air Portugal
- In office 10 June 2017 – 2021

President & CEO of AICEP Portugal Global
- In office 24 April 2014 – 9 May 2017
- Preceded by: Pedro Reis
- Succeeded by: Luís Filipe de Castro Henriques

Secretary of State of the Treasury and Finances
- In office 8 April 2002 – 8 April 2003
- Prime Minister: José Manuel Durão Barroso
- Preceded by: Rodolfo Vasco Lavrador
- Succeeded by: Francisco Esteves de Carvalho

Deputy of the Assembly of the Republic Elections: 2002, 2005, 2009, 2011
- In office 5 April 2002 – 22 October 2015
- Constituency: (2009-2015); Porto (2005-2009); Guarda (2002-2005); Setúbal

Personal details
- Born: Miguel Jorge Reis Antunes Frasquilho; 12 November 1965 (age 60) Setúbal, Portugal
- Party: Social Democratic Party
- Education: Catholic University of Portugal

Miguel Reis Antunes Frasquilho is a Portuguese economist, politician, and executive, currently serving as Chairman of the Board of TAP Air Portugal, Portugal's flag carrier airline. He also serves on the Olympic Committee of Portugal.

A member of the Social Democratic Party (PSD), Frasquilho served in the Portuguese Parliament for 13 years, where he was vice-president of the PSD Parliamentary Group. He also served as Secretary of State of the Treasury and Finances from 2002 to 2003, in José Manuel Barroso's short-lived government prior to becoming president of the EU Commission. He was the president and CEO of AICEP Portugal Global, the Portuguese Government's Trade & Investment Agency, from 2014 to 2017.

== Education and early life ==
Miguel Jorge Reis Antunes Frasquilho was born on 12 November 1965, in Setúbal, Portugal, to Fernando José Antunes Frasquilho, an official in the merchant navy, and Maria Susete Reis Antunes Frasquilho, a professor. His uncle was Manuel Antunes Frasquilho, former president of the Port of Lisbon and the Lisbon Metro, and his cousin is Portuguese-American executive Helder Fragueiro Antunes.

He attained a bachelor's in economics from the Lisbon School of Business & Economics of the Catholic University of Portugal in 1988 and a master's in economic theory from the Nova School of Business and Economics of the Universidade Nova de Lisboa in 1997. He taught various disciplines in economics and quantitative methods at the Católica Lisbon School of Business & Economics and the Nova School of Business and Economics.

== Politics ==
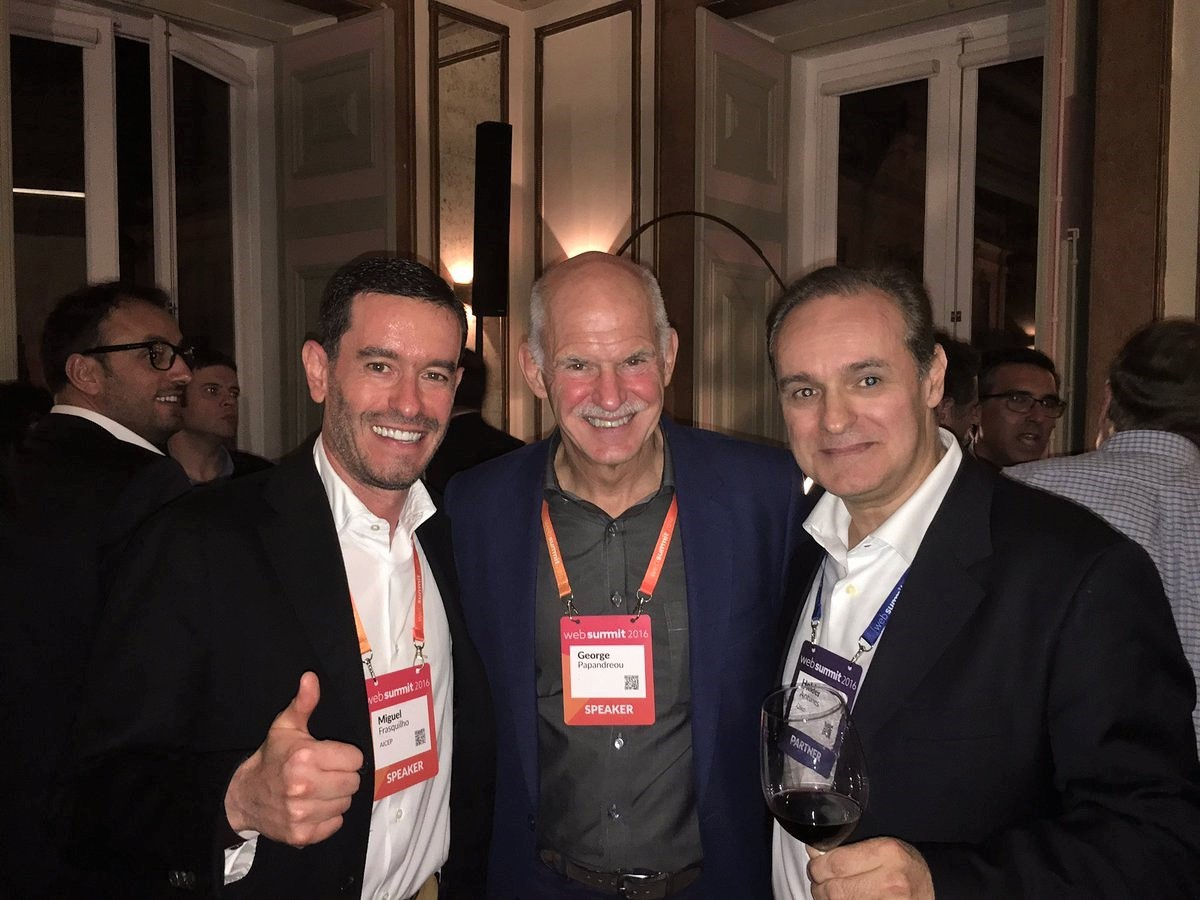
Frasquilho with former prime minister of Greece George Papandreou (center) and Helder Antunes (right), Silicon Valley executive; Lisbon Web Summit, 2016.

Frasquilho started his political career as an advisor to the State Secretary of Trade from 1993 to 1995 in the XII Government. In 1996, he joined Banco Espírito Santo, where he served as Coordinating Director of Espírito Santo Research.

He is a member of the Social Democratic Party and was first elected to the Portuguese Parliament in 2002, in the IX Legislature of the Third Portuguese Republic (2002–2005). He held his position as a deputy in Parliament in the following X (2005–2009), XI (2009–2011), and XII (2011–2015) Legislatures.

Frasquilho entered the XV Constitutional Government as secretary of state for treasury and finance, from 2002 to 2003.

He returned to the Portuguese Parliament, where he was president of the Parliamentary Commission for Public Works, Transport, and Communications between March 2005 and October 2008.

Frasquilho was also part of the Commission for Corporate Income Tax Reform, which took place between January and July 2013.

== Career ==
Frasquilho has served as Chairman of the Board of João Mata, Lda, a Portuguese multinational insurance consultancy and brokerage, since 2017. He is also a lecturer at the Catholic University of Portugal.

=== AICEP ===
In April 2014, Frasquilho was chosen to be President of AICEP, the Portuguese Government's Trade & Investment Agency.

=== TAP Portugal ===
In March 2017, Frasquilho was appointed to be Chairman of the Board of TAP Portugal, Portugal's flag carrier airline.

== Published works ==
Sole authorship:

- “As Raizes do Mal, a Troika e o Futuro” (2013).

Co-authorship:

- Portugal Agora (2017)
- Portugal e o Futuro – Homenagem a Ernâni Lopes (2011)
- As Farpas da Quarta (2009)
- 4R – Quarta República (2007)
- Produtividade e Crescimento em Portugal (2002)
- Portugal Europeu? (2001)
