= Dew computing =

Information technology paradigm

Dew computing is an information technology (IT) paradigm that combines the core concept of cloud computing with the capabilities of end devices (personal computers, mobile phones, etc.). It is used to enhance the experience for the end user in comparison to only using cloud computing. Dew computing attempts to solve major problems related to cloud computing technology, such as reliance on internet access. Dropbox is an example of the dew computing paradigm, as it provides access to the files and folders in the cloud in addition to keeping copies on local devices. This allows the user to access files during times without an internet connection; when a connection is established again, files and folders are synchronized back to the cloud server.

== History ==
The term "dew computing", as used in information technology, first appeared in 2015 in IT literature and since then has become a field of its own. The cloud-dew architecture was proposed by Yingwei Wang as a possible solution to the offline data accessibility problem. At first, its scope included only web applications; broader applications were later proposed.

Dew computing is a model which was derived from the original concept of cloud computing. Other models have also emerged from cloud computing, including fog computing, edge computing, and others. Proponents claim that these novel models, such as dew computing, can provide better experiences for users.

Cloud computing provides universal access and scalability. However, having all the resources far from a user's control occasionally causes problems. In the classic cloud computing paradigm, when the internet connection to the servers is lost, the user is unable to access their data; dew computing aims to solve this problem.

== Definition ==
As an information technology paradigm, dew computing seeks to use the capabilities of personal computers along with cloud services in a more reliable manner.

The key features of dew computing are independence and collaboration. Independence means that the local device must be able to provide service without a continuous connection to the Internet. Collaboration means that the application must be able to connect to the cloud service and synchronize data when appropriate.

Use of the word "dew" reflects natural phenomena: clouds are far from the ground, fog is closer to the ground, and dew is on the ground. Analogically, cloud computing is a remote service, fog computing is beside the user, and dew computing is at the user end.

== Architecture ==
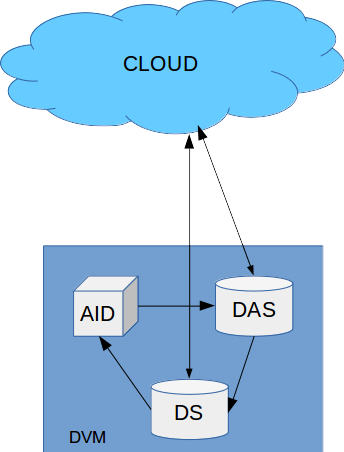
DVM-cloud architecture

To establish a cloud-dew architecture on a PC, a dew virtual machine (DVM) is needed. The DVM is an isolated environment for executing the dew server on the local PC, and it consists of at least three components: the dew server (DS), the data analytics server (DAS), and the artificial intelligence of the dew (AID).

- Dew server (DS): The DS acts like the cloud service on the local PC. It interacts with and periodically synchronizes content with the cloud service.
- Dew analytics server (DAS): The dew analytics server collects data about how the dew server is being used.
- Artificial intelligence of the dew (AID): After receiving data from the DAS about usage patterns, the AID uses the data to customize and tailor the dew server to the user to enhance their experience.

== Categories ==
The dew computing categories are classified based on the application field.

- Web in Dew (WiD)
  - The local device must possess a duplicated fraction of the World Wide Web (WWW) or a modified copy of that fraction to satisfy the independence feature. Because this fraction synchronizes with the web, it satisfies the collaboration feature of dew computing.
- Storage in Dew (SiD)
  - The storage of the local device is partially or fully copied into the cloud. An example is Dropbox, in which a user can create a folder in the cloud, and have access to the folder and its contents on the local device once synchronization is complete. Since the user can access files at any time without the need for constant Internet access, this category meets the independence feature of dew computing. SiD also meets the collaboration feature because the folder and its contents automatically synchronize with the cloud service.
- Database in Dew (DBiD)
  - The local device and the cloud both store copies of the same database. One of these two databases is considered the main version and can be defined as such by the database administrator. This service increases the reliability of a database, as one of the databases can act as the backup for the other.
- Software in Dew (SiD)
  - The configuration and ownership of software are saved in the cloud. Examples include the Apple App Store and Google Play, where the applications the user installs are saved to their account and can then be installed on any device linked to their account.
- Platform in Dew (PiD)
  - A software development suite must be installed on the local device with the settings and application data synchronized to the cloud service. A Software Development Kit on its own does not satisfy these requirements; it must be able to synchronize development data, system deployment data, and online backups. An example of PiD is GitHub.
- Infrastructure as Dew (IaD)
  - The local device is dynamically supported by cloud services. IaD can come in different forms, but the following two forms can be used: (1) the local device can have an exact duplicate DVM instance in the cloud, which is always kept in the same state as the local instance, or (2) the local device can have all its settings/data saved in the cloud, including system settings/data and data for each application.
- Data in Dew (DiD)
  - The term DiD is applied when all its applications satisfy the independence and collaboration requirements but cannot be placed in any of the above categories. An example is the Novell Groupwise email client.

== Possible challenges ==
Dew computing faces a number of technical challenges, including issues related to power management, processor utility, and data storage. Other factors impacting the use of dew computing are the viability of the operation system, network model, communication model, programming principles, dew recommended engine, local dew network, personal high productivity, database security, and behaviors of the browser.

== See also ==
- Thick client
- Distributed computing
- Dropbox
- MEGA
- Google Drive
- Amazon Web Services
- iCloud
