= OpenFog Consortium =

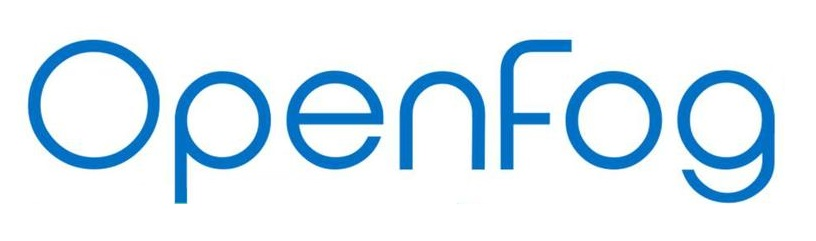
- Company type: Consortium
- Industry: Telecommunications
- Founded: 19 November 2015
- Founders: Cisco Systems; Intel; Microsoft; Princeton University; Dell; ARM Holdings
- Headquarters: Fremont, California
- Key people: Chairman and President; Matt Vasey; Treasurer; Brent Hodges
- Website: openfogconsortium.org

The OpenFog Consortium (sometimes stylized as Open Fog Consortium) was a consortium of high tech industry companies and academic institutions across the world aimed at the standardization and promotion of fog computing in various capacities and fields.

The consortium was founded by Cisco Systems, Intel, Microsoft, Princeton University, Dell, and ARM Holdings in 2015 and now has 57 members across the North America, Asia, and Europe, including Forbes 500 companies and noteworthy academic institutions.

The OpenFog consortium merged with the Industrial Internet Consortium, now the Industry IoT Consortium, on January 31, 2019.

== History ==
OpenFog was created on November 19, 2015, by ARM Holdings, Cisco Systems, Dell, Intel, Microsoft, and Princeton University.

The idea for a consortium centered on the advancement and dissemination of fog computing was thought up by Helder Antunes, a Cisco executive with a history in IoT, Mung Chiang, then a Princeton University professor and now President of Purdue University, and Dr. Tao Zhang, a Cisco Distinguished Engineer and CIO for the IEEE Communications Society then and now a manager at the National Institute of Standards and Technologies (NIST). The project was executed from concept to launch by Armando Pereira at PVentures Consulting, a Silicon Valley–based high-tech consulting firm.

OpenFog released its reference architecture for fog computing on February 13, 2017.

The Fog World Congress 2017, with Dr. Tao Zhang as its General Chair, was hosted in October 2017 by OpenFog, in conjunction with the IEEE Communications Society, as the first congress devoted to fog computing.

== Administration ==
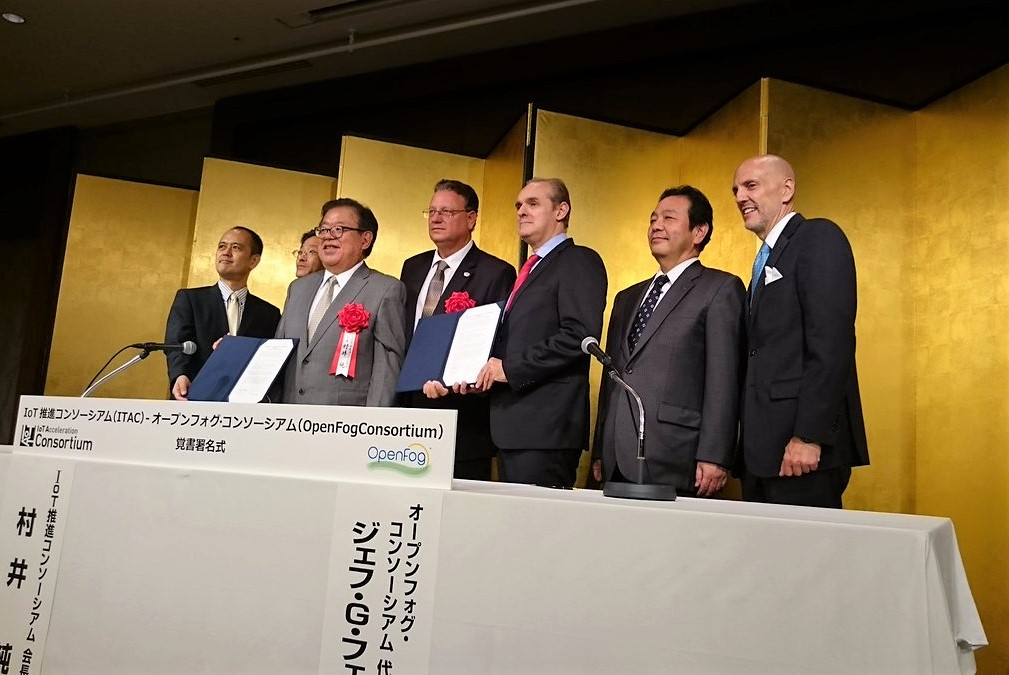
OpenFog executive leadership signing an agreement with the Japanese Ministry of Economy, Trade, and Industry (METI)

The OpenFog Consortium was governed by its board of directors, which is chaired by Cisco Senior Director Helder Antunes. The board of directors is made up of 11 seats, each representing one of the following companies and institutions: ARM, AT&T, Cisco, Dell, Intel, Microsoft, Princeton University, IEEE, GE, ZTE and Shanghai Tech University.

The consortium's general membership comprised 13 academic members: Aalto University, Arizona State University, California Institute of Technology, Georgia State University, National Chiao Tung University, National Taiwan University, Shanghai Research Centre for Wireless Communication, Chinese University of Hong Kong, University of Colorado Boulder, University of Southern California, University of Pisa, Vanderbilt University, Wayne State University, and 20 additional members: Hitachi, Internet Initiative Japan, Itochu, Kii, Nebbiolo, PrismTech, NEC, NGD Systems, NTT Communications, OSIsoft, Real-time Innovations, relayr, Sakura Internet, Stichting imec Nederland, Toshiba, TTT Tech, Fujitsu, FogHorn Systems, TTTech and MARSEC.

== Published work ==
The OpenFog Consortium published the white paper, "OpenFog Reference Architecture". This document outlines the eight pillars of an OpenFog architecture:Security; Scalability; Open; Autonomy; Programmability; RAS (reliability, availability and serviceability); Agility; and Hierarchy. It also incorporates a glossary for fog computing terms.

In July 2018, the IEEE Standards Association announced it had adopted the OpenFog Reference Architecture as the first standard for fog computing.
