= Macaris Antunes do Livramento =

Brazilian boxer

Macaris Antunes Do Livramento
Personal information
- Nationality: Brazilian
- Height: 1.70 m (5 ft 7 in)

Boxing career

Macaris Antunes Do Livramento (born 26 May 1960) is a Brazilian welterweight boxer, southpaw (left-handed), world champion (World Boxing Commission Welterweight Title), Americas champion and Brazilian champion.

== Record ==
110 fights - wins 105 - losses 05 - KO victories 78

== Personal history ==
Livramento was born on 26 May 1960 in Orleans in Santa Catarina state. In 1965 he moved to Curitiba with the family. In 1986, at the age of 26 he started to train boxing in the Muaithai Academy of Curitiba. In 1989, following many amateur fights (23 with 21 wins) he turned professional.

In 1993 he ranked number 1 in the Brazilian ranking. On 10 January 1995, he fought Luiz Von Graff, then Brazilian champion, and loses on points. On 9 March 1996 he won by KO at the 6th round vs Silvio Orlando de Mello becoming Intercontinental Champion of the Americas. On 9 March 1996 he became (World Boxing Commission) world champion after winning by KO at the third round vs Argentinian Alessandro Walter Baez. ON 20 January 2002, after a retirement period he came back and won the Brazilian belt (CBBP) vs João Pereira.

== Titles ==
- Number 1 in the CBB Brazilian ranking from 1993 to 1995
- Intercontinental Champion of the Americas - 9 March 1995
- World Boxing Commission World champion - 9 March 1996
- Brazilian champion (CBBP) - 27 January 2002

== Others ==
On 17 October 2006, he received an honorary citizenship of Curitiba for being the first boxer from Paraná state to fight for a Brazilian belt, and for later winning a world title (World Boxing Commission).

President of Paraná's state Brazilian Boxing Federation.

Plays himself in the movie Heróis da Liberdade from director Lucas Amberg.

Teaches boxing in his gym with the help of Luiz Von Graff

His site https://web.archive.org/web/20070202051309/http://www.macarisboxe.com.br/

Paraná's state Boxing Federation site
