= Manuel Frasquilho =

Portuguese transportation executive and politician

President of the Port of Lisbon
- In office 2005–2009

President of the Lisbon Metro
- In office 2000 – 31 August 2003
- Succeeded by: Carlos Mineiro Alves

Chairman of the Board of Comboios de Portugal
- In office 1996–1997
- Preceded by: António Brito da Silva
- Succeeded by: Crisóstomo Teixeira

Personal details
- Born: Manuel Alcindo Antunes Frasquilho
- Died: 8 August 2015 Lisbon, Portugal

Dr. Manuel Alcindo Antunes Frasquilho (died 8 August 2015, in Lisbon) was a Portuguese transportation executive and politician. He served, at different times, as President of the Port of Lisbon Administration and of the Lisbon Metro, for which he was known for expanding the metro and reducing its costs significantly, gaining him the epithet "turbogestor" ("turbo-executor"). He also served as the chairman of the board of Comboios de Portugal, Portugal's state-owned rail company.

== Career ==
Frasquilho served as President of the Lisbon Metro, from 2000 to 2003, during which he oversaw the expansion of the Linha Verde (Green line) and the integration of funds from the European Investment Bank into the Metro Administration's budget, Frasquilho notably lessened operating costs for the metro, without firings. After his time serving as the President of the Metro, Frasquilho continually appeared in Portuguese parliament to defend public spending in the transportation sector.

Frasquilho was President of the Port of Lisbon Administration (APL), from 2005 to 2009, during which he implemented the Plano Estratégico do Porto de Lisboa (Strategic Plan for the Port of Lisbon), a massive long term modernization and development plan, aimed at increasing port traffic, efficiency, and accessibility. Frasquilh was elected President of the RETE – Association for the Collaboration between Ports and Cities in 2005.

Frasquilho was a representative of the Portuguese branch of the European Centre of Enterprises with Public Participation and of Enterprises of General Economic Interest (CEEP) and served as chairman of the board of directors for Comboios de Portugal, Portugal's state-owned rail company, between 1996 and 1997. He was also chairman of the Board of REFER Fundação Rede Ferroviária de Seguridade Social (Railway Social Security Foundation).

== Personal life ==
Manuel Alcindo Antunes Frasquilho was married to Maria Adélia de Secca da Silva Reis Frasquilho. They had two daughters, Ana Teresa de Secca Reis Antunes Frasquilho and Rita Maria De Secca Reis Antunes Frasquilho. Dr. Manuel Frasquilho was also uncle of Miguel Antunes Frasquilho, politician and current TAP Air Portugal CEO, and cousin to Helder Fragueiro Antunes, Silicon Valley executive.

He died on 8 May 2015, in Lisbon, Portugal.

== Published works ==
- The Sustainable Strategic Development of the Port of Lisbon, 2008
