= José Antunes Sobrinho =

Brazilian civil engineer

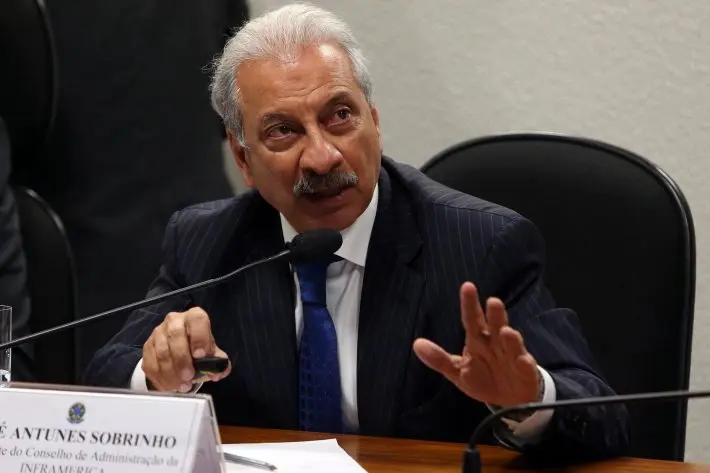

José Antunes Sobrinho (born 1962) is a Brazilian civil engineer and energy executive who specializes in hydroelectric and other energy projects. He holds a degree from the Federal University of Paraná (1974) and a Master's degree in hydraulic engineering from the Delft University of Technology, Netherlands (1978).

== History ==
In 1986, Antunes was appointed Director General of ENGEVIX Engenharia S/A.

Antunes has worked on the Itaipu (14,000 MW), Tucuruí Dam (8,370 MW), Belo Monte Dam (11,233 MW under construction); Ita Dam (1,450 MW), Campos Novos Dam (880 MW), Barra Grande Hydroelectric Power Plant (690 MW) and other hydro projects.

Antunes is also an active consultant and provides local support for UK-based Coopers & Lybrand. He helped drive forward the Brazilian energy sector restructuring program, which basically set the foundations for the way the industry's regulatory and legal frameworks would operate.

Antunes was a member of the teams consulting on the Itaipu (14,000 MW) and Machadinho Hydroelectric Power Plant (1,240 MW) projects. He has also worked on projects in Asia (Vietnam, China and Nepal), Africa (Congo, Angola and Namibia) and South America (Peru, Mexico and elsewhere). In 2009, he was invited to lecture at MIT (the Massachusetts Institute of Technology) on renewable energy in Brazil.

In May 1995, Antunes founded DESENVIX, the investment arm of ENGEVIX that focuses on the energy industry. DESENVIX generated the equivalent of 400 MW provided by clean energy sources and ongoing or planned hydro, biomass and wind energy projects that had capacity to provide around 2,000 MW.

Antunes managed the INFRAMERICA consortium, that built the new Natal Airport (Rio Grande do Norte) and modernizing and expanding Brasília Airport,.

The group also has many maritime construction contracts and builds hulls for Floating production storage and offloading platforms.

José Antunes Sobrinho is currently a shareholder of Nova Participações, the holding company of Nova Engevix and Ecovix. Ecovix announced its exit from judicial reorganization proceedings and the signing of two contracts with Transpetro, a subsidiary of Petrobras.

The contracts provide for the construction of four Handy-type vessels and five gas carriers. The projects are part of initiatives aimed at resuming activities in the Brazilian shipbuilding industry, with effects on the Rio Grande do Sul naval hub, including the reactivation of industrial operations and jobs.

In interviews with the press, Antunes has advocated for long-term investments in the shipbuilding industry and in sectors considered strategic for the country’s economic development.
