= Port of Lisbon =

Coordinates: 38.6989°N 9.1692°W

Port of Lisbon Porto de Lisboa
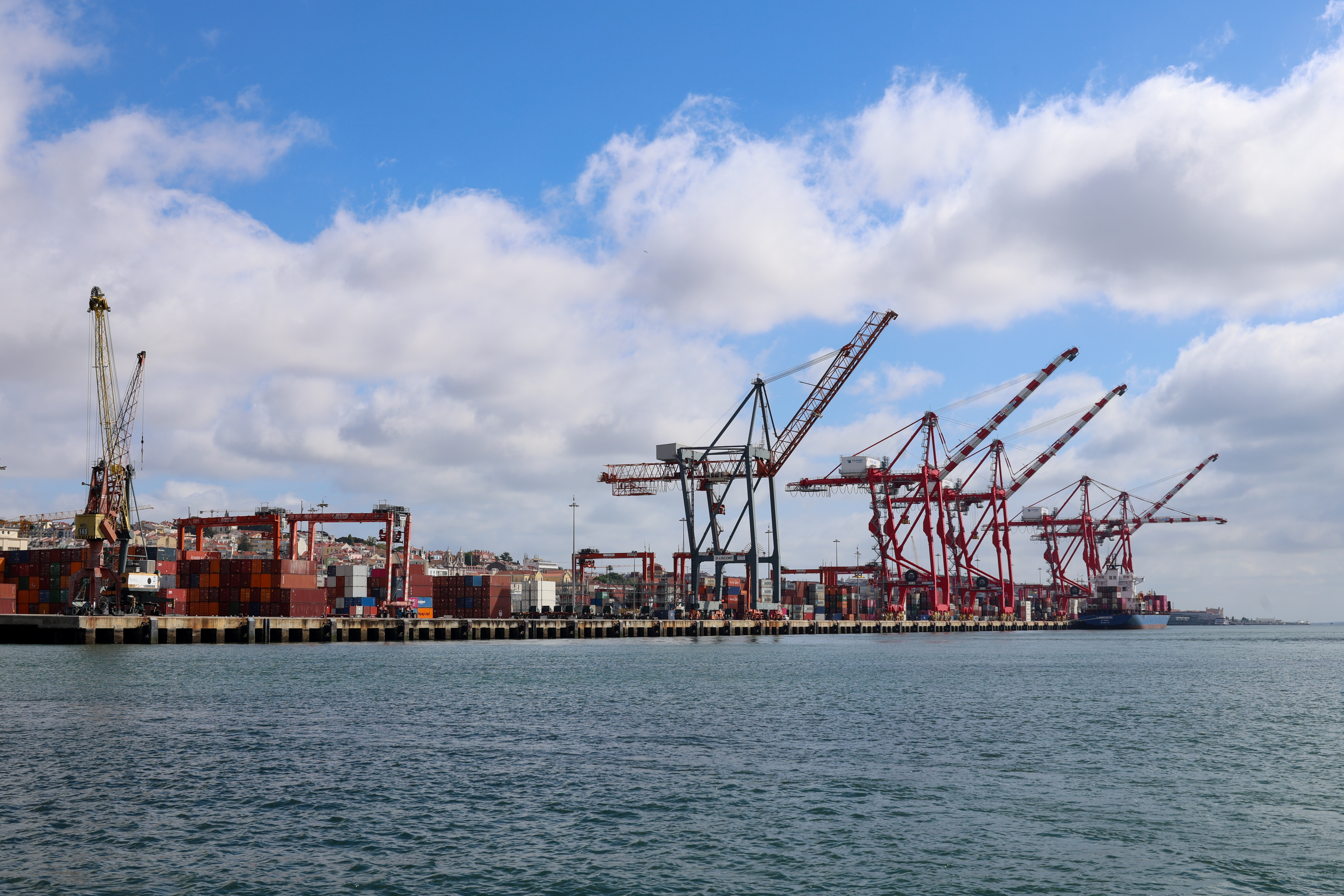
- Interactive map of Port of Lisbon; Porto de Lisboa

Location
- Country: Portugal
- UN/LOCODE: PTLIS

Details
- Operated by: APL
- Owned by: Portuguese state

Statistics
- Annual cargo tonnage: 11,500,000 tonnes (2025)
- Annual container volume: 481,396 TEU (2025)
- Passenger traffic: 206,226 (2025)
- Website; Official Website

The Port of Lisbon (Portuguese: Porto de Lisboa) is the third-largest port in Portugal, mainly on the north sides of the Tagus's large natural harbour that opens west, through a short strait, onto the Atlantic Ocean. Each part lies against central parts of the Portuguese capital Lisbon. Due to its strategic site between Europe, Africa, and the Atlantic, it is one of the most accessed and used in Europe. For container ships it begins with a 1080-metre mooring, with cranes, south of a thin, rectangular, pleasure boat marina. It is north-east of the centre of the strait-spanning suspension bridge, the Ponte 25 de Abril. Continuations are to the north-east. These are a bank-side cruise ship terminal next to the old Alfama district, followed by multi-use harbour-side terminals at Xabregas, Grilo, Beato ([ˈbjatu]) and Braço de Prata, Marvila (Lisbon).

Denser military docks are beyond a headland to the south-east – Lisbon Naval Base, long colloquially synonymous with Alfeite, a slightly wider, once royally-owned, district.

== History ==
There are data on human presence in the Tagus estuary since prehistory. Probably the Phoenicians were in this area in the 12th century BC and they would create a commercial port in the north margin of the River Tagus. In 205 BC, the city (known as Olissippo) was conquered by the Romans. In the 5th century the Suebi conquered the area, followed by the Visigoths. In AD 714, the Moors conquered Lisbon, expanding the port with their Mediterranean and Atlantic trades.

During Alfonso III's reign and the Age of Exploration, Lisbon became a major hub. The capital was also moved from Coimbra to Lisbon.

Beyond the 1600s Casa da Guiné, a customhouse, was established. This customhouse managed overseas trade. Because of this, the city began to attract merchants from abroad, such as cities and regions like Genoa, Flanders, and Mallorca.

In the 1700s it became a major slave-trading center. Also during this era, in 1755, a devastating earthquake struck Lisbon.

Manuel Antunes Frasquilho was President of the Port of Lisbon Administration (APL), from 2005 to 2009, during which he implemented the Plano Estratégico do Porto de Lisboa (Strategic Plan for the Port of Lisbon), a massive long term modernization and development plan, aimed at increasing port traffic, efficiency, and accessibility. Frasquilho was elected President of the RETE – Association for the Collaboration between Ports and Cities in 2005.

== Gallery ==
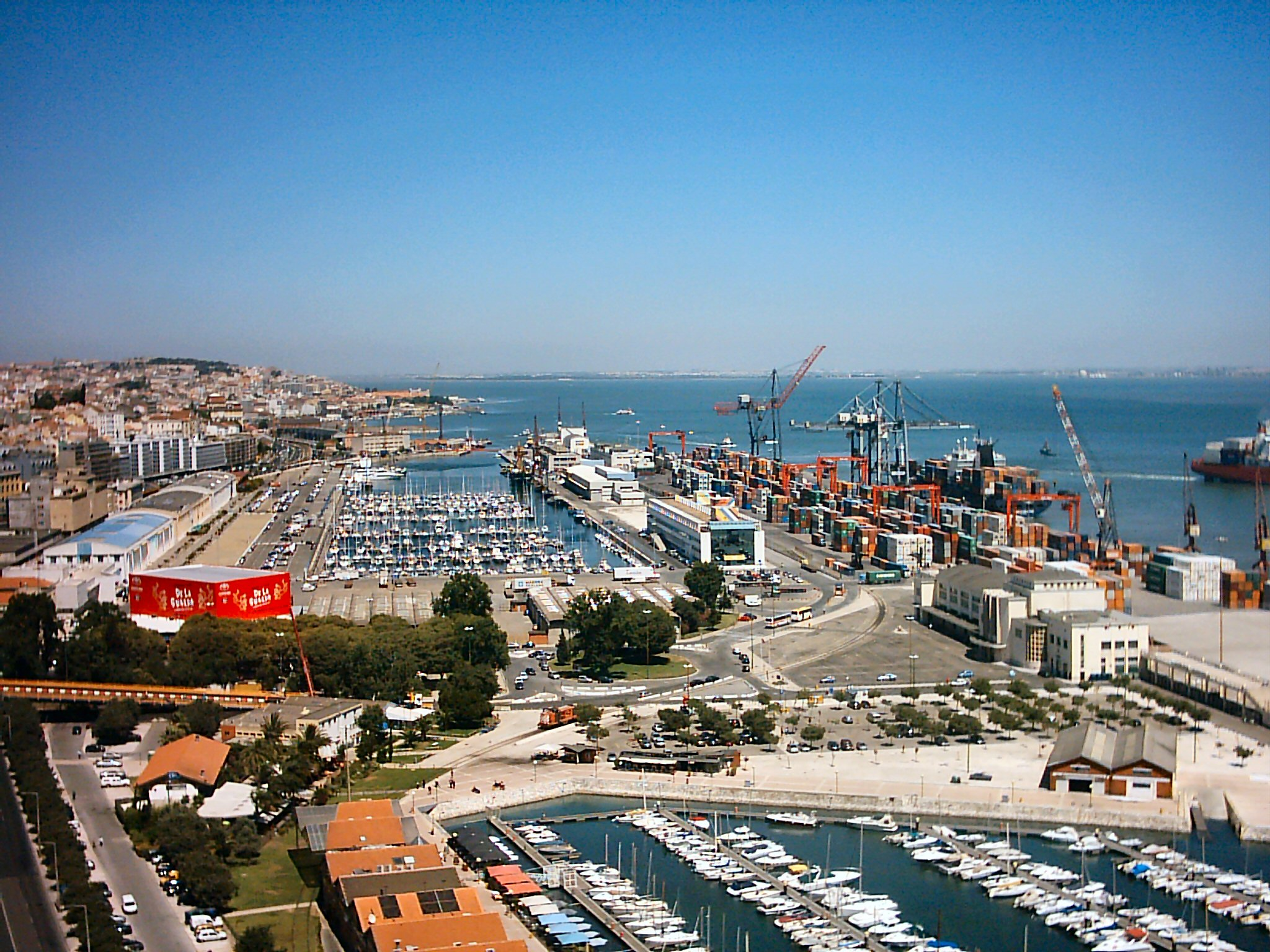
Overview of the Port.

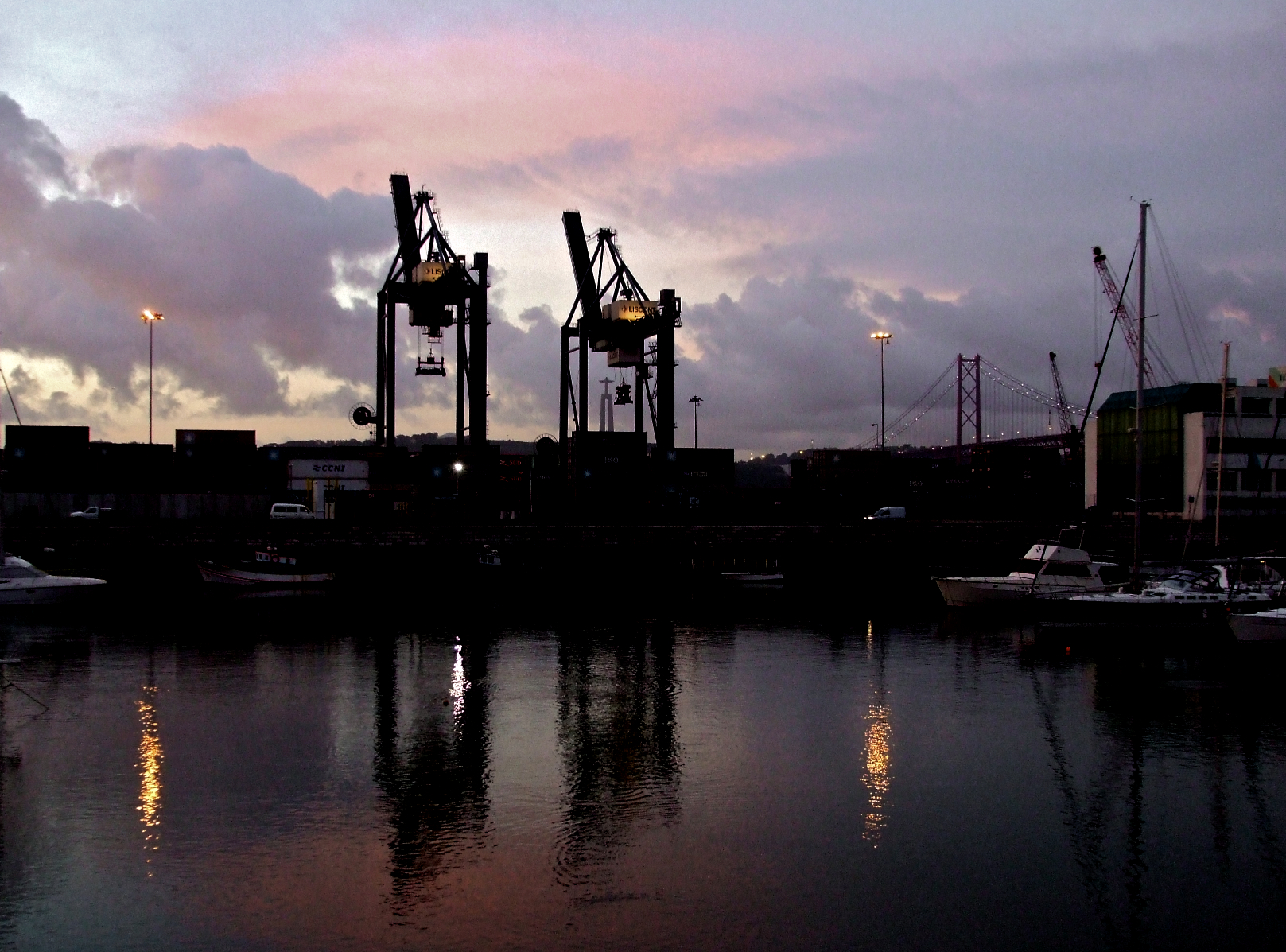
View of the Port at dusk.

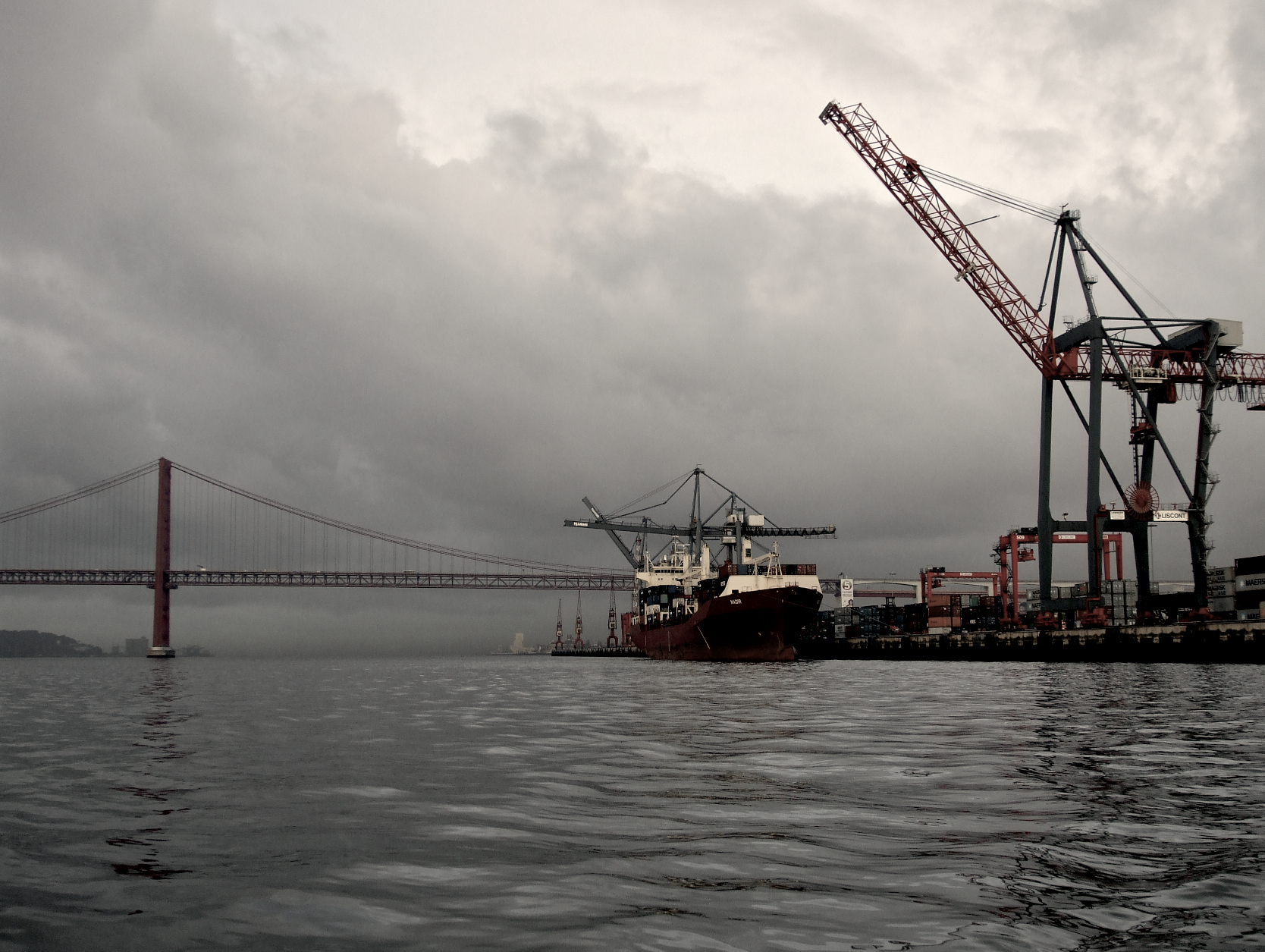
View of the Port with the 25 de Abril Bridge on the background.

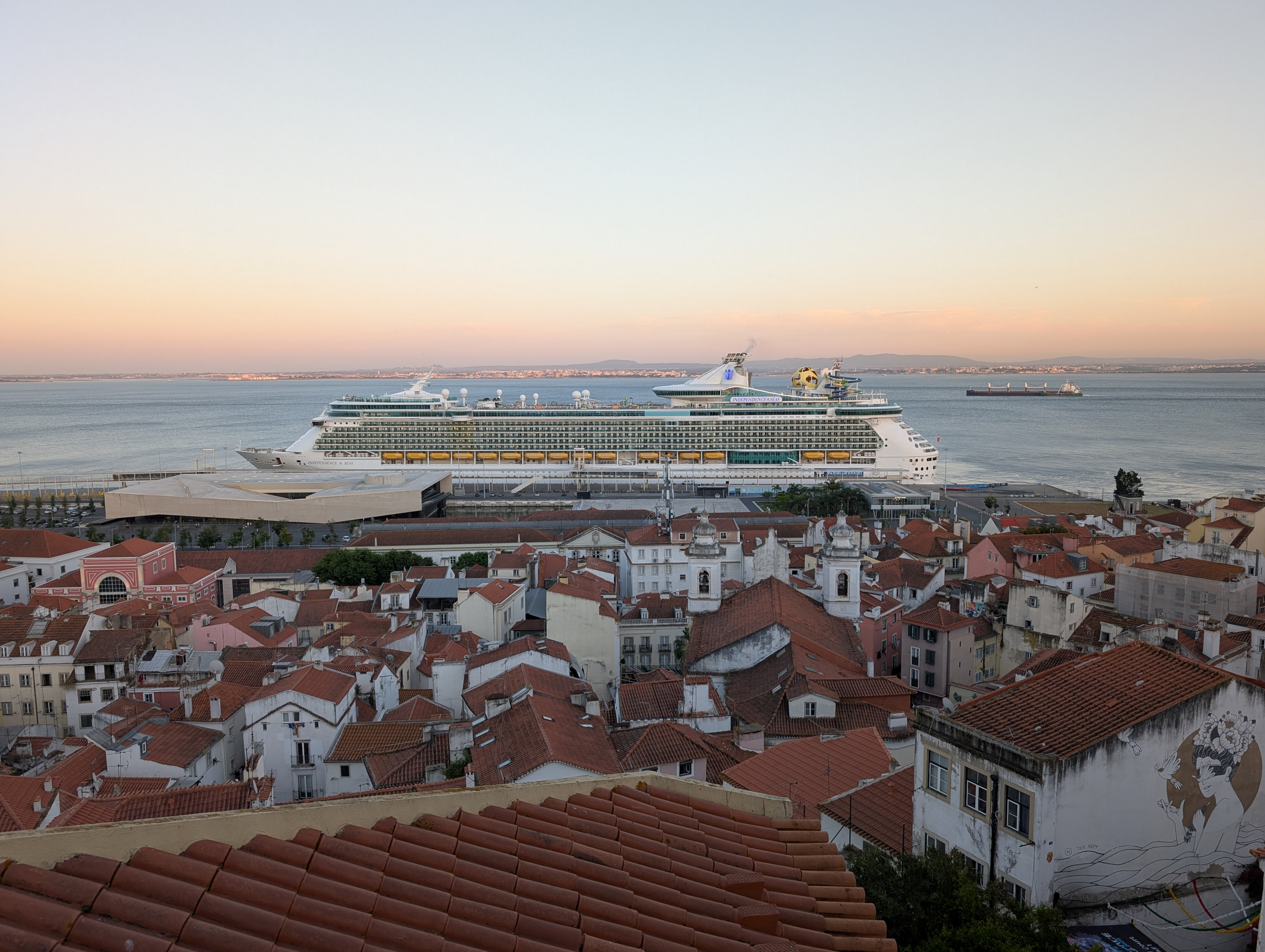
Lisbon Cruise Terminal.

== Bibliography ==
- Kin, Kap Hwan and Günther, Container terminals and cargo systems: Design, operations management and logistics. Heidelberg: Springer, 2007. ISBN 978-3-540-49549-9
