= Edge device =

Entry point into a computer network

In computer networking, an edge device is a device that provides an entry point into enterprise or service provider core networks. Examples include routers, routing switches, integrated access devices (IADs), multiplexers, and a variety of metropolitan area network (MAN) and wide area network (WAN) access devices. Edge devices also provide connections into carrier and service provider networks. An edge device that connects a local area network to a high speed switch or backbone (such as an ATM switch) may be called an edge concentrator.

== Functions ==
In general, edge devices are normally routers that provide authenticated access (most commonly PPPoA and PPPoE) to faster, more efficient backbone and core networks. The trend is to make the edge device smart and the core device(s) "dumb and fast", so edge routers often include quality of service (QoS) and multi-service functions to manage different types of traffic. Consequently, core networks are often designed with switches that use routing protocols such as Open Shortest Path First (OSPF) or Multiprotocol Label Switching (MPLS) for reliability and scalability, allowing edge routers to have redundant links to the core network. Links between core networks are different—for example, Border Gateway Protocol (BGP) routers are often used for peering exchanges.

== Translation ==
Edge devices may translate between one type of network protocol and another. For example, Ethernet or Token Ring types of local area networks (LANs) or xDSL equipment may use an Asynchronous Transfer Mode (ATM) backbone to other core networks. ATM networks send data in cells and use connection-oriented virtual circuits. An IP network is packet oriented; so if ATM is used as a core, packets must be encapsulated in cells and the destination address must be converted to a virtual circuit identifier. Some new types of optical fibre use a passive optical network subscriber loop such as GPON, with the edge device connecting to Ethernet for backhaul (telecommunications).

== Multiservice units ==
An edge switch for a WAN may be a multiservice unit, meaning that it supports a wide variety of communication technologies, including Integrated Services Digital Network (ISDN), T1 circuits, Frame Relay, and ATM. An edge device may provide enhanced services, such as virtual private networking (VPN) support, Voice over IP, and QoS services.
