= AICEP Portugal Global =

Portuguese Trade and Investment Agency
- Predecessor: Instituto do Comércio Externo de Portugal (ICEP)
- Formation: 30 October 2002; 23 years ago
- Type: Government agency
- Headquarters: Porto, Portugal
- Coordinates: 41°9′20.832759″N 8°37′36.45889″W
- Owner: Government of Portugal
- President and CEO: Madalena Oliveira e Silva
- Affiliations: Ministry of Foreign Affairs; Ministry of the Economy
- Website: www.portugalglobal.pt

The Portuguese Trade and Investment Agency (AICEP) (Note: Portuguese: Agência para o Investimento e Comércio Externo de Portugal) is an independent public entity of the Government of Portugal, with the goal of attracting foreign investment to Portugal and supporting the internationalisation of Portuguese companies into the global economy.

AICEP is the public body that promotes the attraction of productive inward investment and the internationalization of the Portuguese economy, fostering export growth and the international expansion of Portuguese companies. Aicep has offices in Portugal and an external network in around 50 countries.
