= Turbot (disambiguation) =

Turbot is a species of flatfish.

Turbot may also refer to:

- Turbot (business)
- Turbot Island, a small Irish island
- Turbot Street, a major thoroughfare in Brisbane, Queensland, Australia
- Turbot Township, Pennsylvania, United States
- Turbot War, a fishing dispute between Canada and the European Union
- USS Turbot, two submarines of the United States Navy
- "Turbot", a phantom ballplayer once thought to have played a Major League Baseball game in 1902
- Turbot-Rhino 1 and Turbot 2, fictive cars appearing in various Spirou & Fantasio comic strips
- Cap'n Turbot, a major character in the Canadian television series Paw Patrol
- The Turbot, a variation of the French fairy tale The Dolphin by Henriette-Julie de Murat
- Sébastien Turbot (born 1976), French social entrepreneur
- FV Turbot a French fishing trawler in service 1948–49
