= IQTELL =

Productivity app

- Developers: IQTELL.COM, LLC
- Operating system: Web, Chrome, Android, iOS
- Type: productivity software & personal task management
- License: Proprietary
- Website: web.archive.org/web/20170823091252/https://iqtell.com/

IQTELL was a productivity app that allowed users to manage email, tasks, projects, calendars, contacts, Evernotes and more in a single app. IQTELL was available as a web app, as well as an iOS and Android app. All user information was automatically synced between all devices. iOS and Android apps supported offline access. The app could be used to implement concepts and techniques described in the book Getting Things Done by David Allen.

== History ==
IQTELL was created by Ran Flam and released in 2013.

In 2014, mobile apps for iOS and Android were released.

In 2015, Premium and Platinum subscription plans were introduced (while maintaining the free user version).

In April 2017, a new web app was launched.

On July 31, 2017, all IQTell services have been closed.

== Productivity methods ==
IQTell was designed to fit in with the Getting Things Done (GTD) productivity methods. Users may have had utilized GTD lists, such as Inbox, Actions, Projects, Someday, Ticklers, and Reference information to process their Inbox items into relevant GTD lists.

Using the web app, iOS and/or Android apps, users could deploy macros/shortcuts to quickly process their email. Email was turned into tasks (actions), projects, etc. The original email was removed from the email inbox. The email became a part of the items created (e.g. actions, project, etc.) and could also be viewed in the All Mail folder (if Gmail), or the Archive folder (if non-Gmail). Users had flexibility to use the out-of-the-box macros/shortcuts as well as edit/create additional macros.

IQTELL features included email, calendars, contacts, list management, sharing and collaboration with team members. All of the features were compatible with commonly used organization software such as Evernote and iCloud.
