= Cloud Security Alliance =

US non-profit organization

Cloud Security Alliance (CSA)
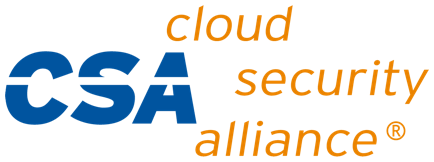
- Formation: 2008; 18 years ago
- Type: Non-profit organization
- Website: cloudsecurityalliance.org

Cloud Security Alliance (CSA) is a not-for-profit organization with the mission to "promote the use of best practices for providing security assurance within cloud computing, artificial intelligence and to provide education on the uses of cloud computing to help secure all other forms of computing."

The CSA has over 80,000 individual members worldwide. The CSA gained significant reputability in 2011 when the American Presidential Administration selected the CSA Summit as the venue for announcing the federal government’s cloud computing strategy.

== History ==
The CSA was formed in December 2008 as a coalition by individuals who saw the need to provide objective enterprise user guidance on the adoption and use of cloud computing. Its initial work product, Security Guidance for Critical Areas of Focus in Cloud Computing, was put together in a Wiki-style by dozens of volunteers.

In 2014, the Chairman of the Board of the CSA was Dave Cullinane, VP of Global Security and Privacy for Catalina Marketing, St. Petersburg, Florida, and former CISO for eBay. Cullinane has said, "If you have an application exposed to the Internet that will allow people to make money, it will be probed."

== Profile ==
In 2009, the Cloud Security Alliance incorporated in Nevada as a Corporation and achieved US Federal 501(c)6 non-profit status. It is registered as a Foreign Non-Profit Corporation in Washington.

== Policy maker support ==
The CSA works to support a number of global policy makers in their focus on cloud security initiatives including the National Institute of Standards and Technology (NIST), European Commission, Singapore Government, and other data protection authorities. In March 2012, the CSA was selected to partner with three of Europe’s largest research centers (CERN, EMBL and ESA) to launch Helix Nebula – The Science Cloud.

== Size ==
The Cloud Security Alliance employs roughly sixty full-time and contract staff worldwide. It has several thousand active volunteers participating in research, working groups and chapters at any time.

== Membership ==
According to CSA, they are a member-driven organization, chartered with promoting the use of best practices for providing security assurance within Cloud Computing, and providing education on the uses of Cloud Computing to help secure all other forms of computing. Individuals who display interest and prior experience in cloud computing and cloud security are likely to receive a complimentary individual membership based on a minimum level of participation.

=== Chapters ===
The Cloud Security Alliance has a network of chapters worldwide. Chapters are separate legal entities from the Cloud Security Alliance, but operate within guidelines set down by the Cloud Security Alliance In the United States, Chapters may elect to benefit from the non-profit tax shield that the Cloud Security Alliance has.

Chapters are encouraged to hold local meetings and participate in areas of research. Chapter activities are coordinated by the Cloud Security Alliance worldwide.

=== International scope ===
There are separate legal entities in Europe and Asia Pacific, called Cloud Security Alliance (Europe), a Scottish company in the United Kingdom, and Cloud Security Alliance Asia Pacific Ltd, in Singapore. Each legal entity is responsible for overseeing all Cloud Security Alliance-related activities in their respective regions.

These legal entities operate under an agreement with Cloud Security Alliance that give it oversight power and have separate Boards of Directors. Both are companies Limited By Guarantee. The Managing Directors of each are members of the Executive Team of Cloud Security Alliance.

== Areas of research ==
The Cloud Security Alliance has 25+ active working groups. Key areas of research include cloud standards, certification, education and training, guidance and tools, global reach, and driving innovation.

- Security Guidance for Critical Areas of Focus in Cloud Computing. Foundational best practices for securing cloud computing.
- Top Threats to Cloud Computing. Helps organizations make educated risk management decisions regarding their cloud adoption strategies.
- GRC (Governance, Risk and Compliance) Stack. A toolkit for key stakeholders to instrument and assess clouds against industry established best practices, standards and critical compliance requirements.
- Cloud Controls Matrix (CCM). Security controls framework for cloud provider and cloud consumers.
- CloudTrust Protocol. The mechanism by which cloud service consumers ask for and receive information about the elements of transparency as applied to cloud service providers.
- Consensus Assessments Initiative Research. Tools and processes to perform consistent measurements of cloud providers.
- Software Defined Perimeter. A proposed security framework that can be deployed to protect application infrastructure from network-based attacks. It will incorporate standards from organizations such as OASIS and NIST and security concepts from organizations like the U.S. DoD into an integrated framework.

== Working groups and initiatives ==
- Mobile Working Group
- Big Data Working Group
- Security as a Service Working Group
- Trusted Cloud Initiative
- CloudAudit
- CloudCERT
- CloudSIRT
- Cloud Metrics
- Security, Trust and Assurance Registry (STAR)
- Cloud Data Governance
- Turbot (business)
- Blockchain/Distributed Ledger
