= Cloudlet =

Small-scale cloud datacenter

A cloudlet is a mobility-enhanced small-scale cloud datacenter that is located at the edge of the Internet. The main purpose of the cloudlet is supporting resource-intensive and interactive mobile applications by providing powerful computing resources to mobile devices with lower latency. It is a new architectural element that extends today's cloud computing infrastructure. It represents the middle tier of a 3-tier hierarchy: mobile device - cloudlet - cloud. A cloudlet can be viewed as a data center in a box whose goal is to bring the cloud closer. The cloudlet term was first coined by M. Satyanarayanan, Victor Bahl, Ramón Cáceres, and Nigel Davies, and a prototype implementation is developed by Carnegie Mellon University as a research project. The concept of cloudlet is also known as follow me cloud, and mobile micro-cloud.

== Motivation ==
Many mobile services split the application into a front-end client program and a back-end server program following the traditional client-server model. The front-end mobile application offloads its functionality to the back-end servers for various reasons such as speeding up processing. With the advent of cloud computing, the back-end server is typically hosted at the cloud datacenter. Though the use of a cloud datacenter offers various benefits such as scalability and elasticity, its consolidation and centralization lead to a large separation between a mobile device and its associated datacenter. End-to-end communication then involves many network hops and results in high latencies and low bandwidth.

For the reasons of latency, some emerging mobile applications require cloud offload infrastructure to be close to the mobile device to achieve low response time. In the ideal case, it is just one wireless hop away. For example, the offload infrastructure could be located in a cellular base station or it could be LAN-connected to a set of Wi-Fi base stations. The individual elements of this offload infrastructure are referred to as cloudlets.

== Applications ==
Cloudlets aim to support mobile applications that are both resource-intensive and interactive. Augmented reality applications that use head-tracked systems require end-to-end latencies of less than 16 ms. Cloud games with remote rendering also require low latencies and high bandwidth. Wearable cognitive assistance systems combine devices such as Google Glass with cloud-based processing to guide users through complex tasks. This futuristic genre of applications is characterized as “astonishingly transformative” by the report of the 2013 NSF Workshop on Future Directions in Wireless Networking. These applications use cloud resources in the critical path of real-time user interaction. Consequently, they cannot tolerate end-to-end operation latencies of more than a few tens of milliseconds. Apple Siri and Google Now which perform compute-intensive speech recognition in the cloud, are further examples in this emerging space.

== Cloudlet vs Cloud ==
There is significant overlap in the requirements for cloud and cloudlet. At both levels, there is the need for: (a) strong isolation between untrusted user-level computations; (b) mechanisms for authentication, access control, and metering; (c) dynamic resource allocation for user-level computations; and, (d) the ability to support a very wide range of user-level computations, with minimal restrictions on their process structure, programming languages or operating systems. At a cloud datacenter, these requirements are met today using the virtual machine (VM) abstraction. For the same reasons they are used in cloud computing today, VMs are used as an abstraction for cloudlets. Meanwhile, there are a few but important differentiators between cloud and cloudlet.

=== Rapid provisioning ===
Different from cloud data centers that are optimized for launching existing VM images in their storage tier, cloudlets need to be much more agile in their provisioning. Their association with mobile devices is highly dynamic, with considerable churn due to user mobility. A user from far away may unexpectedly show up at a cloudlet (e.g., if he just got off an international flight) and try to use it for an application such as a personalized language translator. For that user, the provisioning delay before he is able to use the application impacts usability.

=== VM handoff across cloudlets ===
If a mobile device user moves away from the cloudlet he is currently using, the interactive response will degrade as the logical network distance increases. To address this effect of user mobility, the offloaded services on the first cloudlet need to be transferred to the second cloudlet maintaining end-to-end network quality. This resembles live migration in cloud computing but differs considerably in a sense that the VM handoff happens in Wide Area Network (WAN).

== OpenStack++ ==
Since the cloudlet model requires reconfiguration or additional deployment of hardware/software, it is important to provide a systematic way to incentivise the deployment. However, it can face a classic bootstrapping problem. Cloudlets need practical applications to incentivize cloudlet deployment. However, developers cannot heavily rely on cloudlet infrastructure until it is widely deployed. To break this deadlock and bootstrap the cloudlet deployment, researchers at Carnegie Mellon University proposed OpenStack++ that extends OpenStack to leverage its open ecosystem. OpenStack++ provides a set of cloudlet-specific APIs as OpenStack extensions.

== Commercial implementations and standardization effort ==
By 2015 cloudlet based applications were commercially available.

In 2017 the National Institute of Standards and Technology published draft standards for fog computing in which cloudlets were defined as nodes on the fog architecture.

== See also ==
- Mobile cloud computing
- Elijah-cloudlet project
