= Multisite cloud =

Cloud computing concept

A multisite cloud is a cloud composed of several single sites (or data centers), each from the same or different providers and explicitly accessible to cloud users. In the multisite cloud environment, the tasks of a program or a workflow should be scheduled in order to achieve efficient processing.
