= Virtual replay =

Technology which allows people to see 3D animations of sporting events

Virtual Replay is a technology which allows people to see 3D animations of sporting events. The technology was widely used during the 2006 FIFA World Cup. During this event, bbcnews.com posted highlights of the event on their websites soon after matches concluded, and users could view the 3D renderings from multiple points of view.

Virtual Replay has been widely used in sports to increase the experience of viewers at home. Virtual Replay is extremely beneficial when watching sports that involve "ball spotting", in which the spot of the ball is extremely important to the outcome of the game. This includes sports like football, soccer, volleyball, baseball, tennis, etc. One of the first instances where we see Virtual Replay being used in sports was in 1998 for Sunday Night Football when ESPN used "Sportvision's 1st& Ten" electronic first down system. This system made it so that viewers at home could see a virtual line on their TV that represented where the first down marker was on the field. After ESPN used this for the first time, 92% of viewers reported that they preferred watching games this way and 64% of viewers reported that it helped them to understand the game better. After its debut on Sunday Night Football, the MLB soon began to use its own version of the Virtual Replay system. They used this system to show real-time, 3D views of pitches, including the speed, movement and location of the ball as soon as the pitcher releases it. This helps viewers see the different types of pitches thrown and allows them to see whether it is a ball versus strike for themselves.

Virtual replay can work in a few different ways. With the technology we have today, these big stadiums and television networks are usually shooting from multiple intertwined 4k cameras that are shooting at 200 frames per second. In 2013, YES Network reported having nine static cameras calibrated in Yankee Stadium positioned along just the first base line. But, not all virtual replay is created using super fancy and expensive 4k cameras, 3D trajectory can be created using 2-dimensional tracking on multiple cameras. In baseball, two cameras that are linked to two computers are used to observe a ball and each computer extracts its own 2D trajectory. The two computers combine their pitch-tracking 2D positions which correspond to the same time code into a 3-dimensional position. These 2D trajectories are sent to a 3D reconstruction module that then creates the 3D trajectories, as well as any impact points separate trajectories (such as a ball bouncing or hitting some object). The complete track of the object is then visualized on the screen. From this, we can see the exact flight path of the ball as well as any objects it hits, how fast it is going, and exactly where it lands.

As technology advances, we are also seeing more advancements with virtual replay. With the rise of virtual reality in recent years, we are seeing a combination of virtual replay and virtual reality. We can now relive the most exciting moments in sports with this combination of virtual reality and virtual replay. Networks set up a camera that shows 360-degree video replays which allows the viewer to control the angle they look at and can turn the camera angle to view a full 360 rotation of the atmosphere around them. It is now possible to view a 360 virtual replay of the biggest sporting events like: MLB World Series, Soccer Champions League final, NFL NFC North Rivalry, Formula 1 Racing, NHL Stanley Cup Play-offs and numerous others.

Virtual replay has changed the at-home viewing experience for sports fans. This technology has not only changed the game, but it is helping outsiders to learn about the game. This is all only the beginning of what is possible with virtual replay and it will be interesting to see how it develops as technology advances.
