= IoT security device =

Internet of Things (IoT) security devices are electronic tools connected via Internet to a common network and are used to provide security measures. These devices can be controlled remotely through a mobile application, web-based interface or any proprietary installed software, and they often have capabilities such as remote video monitoring, intrusion detection, automatic alerts, and smart automation features. IoT security devices form an integral part of the smart ecosystem, which is characterized by the interconnectivity of various appliances and devices through the Internet.

== History ==
The concept of IoT security devices began to gain traction in the early 2010s with the advent of smart technology. The initial devices were primarily focused on remote surveillance that would allow monitoring of the properties remotely using webcams and similar devices. As technology advanced, these systems began to incorporate a wider range of features, such as intrusion detection and automatic alerts.

The rise of smart automation and the proliferation of IoT devices in the mid-2010s led to significant growth in the adoption of IoT security devices by 2021, reflecting increasing consumer interest in smart home technologies.

== Types of IoT Security Devices ==
1. Surveillance сameras: Provide real-time video monitoring and allow remote access through networked interfaces.
2. Smart locks: Can be controlled remotely, sometimes incorporating biometric recognition or automated locking based on proximity.
3. Smart alarms Detect threats such as break-ins, fire, or gas leaks and send alerts to users or authorities.
4. Door/Window Sensors: Trigger alerts when doors or windows are opened or tampered with.
5. Smart Detectors: These devices detect environmental hazards such as smoke, gas leaks, and water leaks, alerting in real time.

== Criticism and Concerns ==
Despite their benefits, IoT security devices have also raised several concerns. The most significant of these is the potential for privacy breaches. As these devices are connected to the internet, they are potentially vulnerable to hacking, which could result in unauthorized access to sensitive data.

There are also concerns about the reliance on internet connectivity. If an internet connection goes down, some devices may become non-functional, potentially leaving the environment unprotected. Similarly, if a device's software isn't regularly updated, it could become vulnerable to security flaws.

Security assessments, including vulnerability assessment and penetration testing, are commonly used to evaluate and improve the security of IoT devices. Manufacturers can now take a security audit of their IoT devices.

== See also ==
- Home automation
- Industry 4.0
- Internet of Things
- Self-Defense
- Physical security
- Web of things
