= Sébastien Turbot =

French entrepreneur (born 1976)

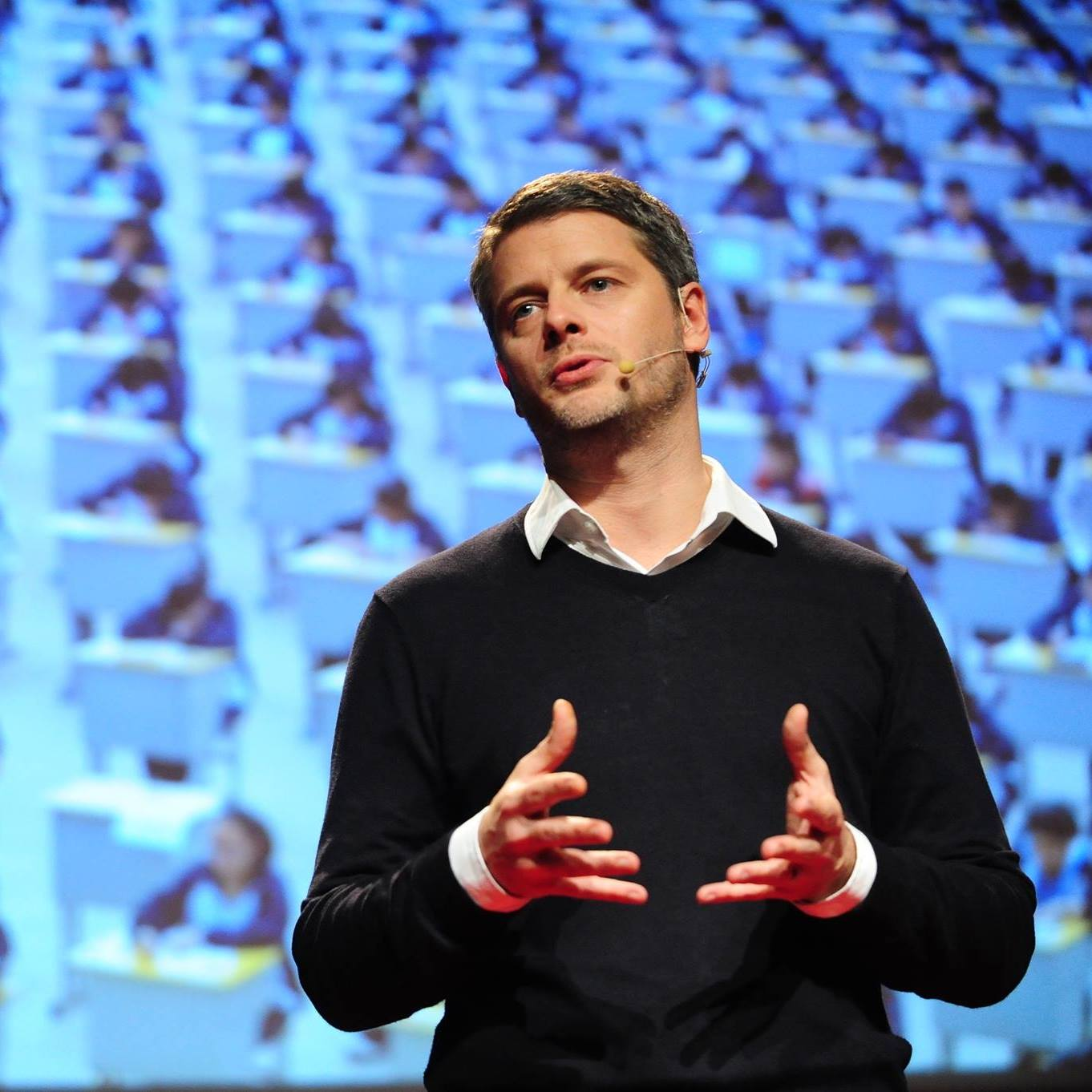
- Born: 25 August 1976 (age 49)

Sébastien Turbot (born 25 October 1976) is a French social entrepreneur.

== Life ==
As the CEO and Chief Curator of eko6, a consultancy based in Canada, Turbot oversees the guidance provided to governments, cities, businesses, and civil society organizations. eko6 specializes in creating engaging platforms aimed at translating ideas into actionable initiatives. Turbot's work primarily revolves around designing innovative learning and living ecosystems. These ecosystems are tailored to assist communities in developing the necessary skills and talents required to tackle the ever-evolving challenges of contemporary and future societies.

Turbot is a board member of Montréal International, where he actively contributes to the city's strategy to enhance its competitiveness, particularly in attracting, training, and retaining skilled individuals. He is the former executive director at the New Cities Foundation and former Culture(s) & Content Curator (TBWA, AUDITOIRE) and Global Director at Qatar Foundation's World Innovation Summit for Education.

Turbot is also a Fellow at the Royal Society for the encouragement of Arts, Manufactures and Commerce (RSA) and serves on the advisory board member at Samuel Hall Consulting, a research and strategic consulting firm. Turbot is a lecturer and a frequently requested advisor and speaker at national and international conferences.

In 2010, Turbot joined TEDx Paris as editorial director, where he defined and designed the initiative's content strategy.

Prior to this role, Turbot spent nearly a decade in Afghanistan, driven by his interest in the global aid and development sector. In 2004, he established Sayara Strategies, a social communication agency that creates innovative strategies for complex environments. Turbot is also a board member at Afghanistan Libre, a not-for-profit founded by Chékéba Hachemi that fosters education for girls in Afghanistan.

Valentin Spidault, a prominent fictiticious character featured in Nicolas Wild's best-selling comic “Kabul Disco” is based on Turbot's engagement with Sayara Strategies.

Turbot has been a senior lecturer at the Paris School of International Affairs (PSIA), Sciences-Po, Paris and has also taught at the French journalism and communication school CELSA Paris, which is part of the Paris-Sorbonne University.

A former journalist, Turbot worked for FRANCE 5's C dans l'air in 2003. In the past, he has also been a public affairs and communication consultant in countries such as Brazil, Djibouti and Afghanistan.

Turbot often writes articles featured on various online media and content portals including Forbes, Entrepreneur, the Skoll World Forum, LinkedIn Pulse and the World Economic Forum's Agenda blog.

== Publications and articles ==
- La Crise de l'éducation TEDxLaRochelle
- Introducing The ‘Selfie Generation’ To The Real World (Huffington Post)
- Confidence Is the Currency of the Future (Entrepreneur.com)
- How Strong Community And Educator Support Drives Ed Tech Success (Forbes)
- Afghanistan: Bringing Girls (Back) to School (Forbes)
- The Web Connects Me to the World, But Conferences Unite Me With My Tribe (Entrepreneur.com)
- You, Too, Can Hack for Good Causes (Christian Science Monitor)
- Let's applaud our silent heroes of social change (Devex)
- Educate Girls, Transform Communities (Skoll World Forum)
- Online to Onsite: Communication to the Rescue (Skoll World Forum)
- Is Higher Education Equipping Young People for the Jobs Market? (World Economic Forum - Agenda)
- Should My Kids Learn to Code (LinkedIn Pulse)
- Has the “Innovation in Education” Bubble Popped? (LinkedIn Pulse)

== Awards and honors ==
Turbot was awarded the Etoile Européenne du Mérite Civil et Militaire in 2002.
