= Eugene Schultz =

Computer security expert (1946 - 2011)

Eugene Schultz (1946 - 2011) was an American computer security researcher and expert on cybersecurity.

== Life ==
Schultz was born on September 10, 1946, in Chicago to E. Eugene Sr. and Elizabeth Schultz. He was married to Cathy Brown for 36 years. The couple had three daughters.

He died of a stroke on October 2, 2011.

== Education ==
He completed his bachelor's degree from UCLA. He later earned his MS and PhD in cognitive sciences from Purdue University.

== Career ==
He was the founder of U.S. Department of Energy's Computer Incident Advisory Capability (CIAC). He managed it for several years. He was the chief technology officer at Emagined Security. He authored several books and papers on computer security. He was the Editor-in-Chief of Computers and Security which is the oldest journal in computing security. He was an adjunct professor at several universities. He was a winner of the Department of Energy's excellence award.
