= Community cloud =

Type of computer infrastructure collaboration

A community cloud in computing is a collaborative effort in which infrastructure is shared between several organizations from a specific community with common concerns (security, compliance, jurisdiction, etc.), whether managed internally or by a third party and hosted internally or externally. This is controlled and used by a group of organizations that have shared interests. The costs are spread over fewer users than a public cloud (but more than a private cloud), so only some of the cost savings potential of cloud computing are realized.

The community cloud is provisioned for use by a group of consumers from different organizations who share the same concerns (e.g., application, security, policy, and efficiency demands).

== See also ==
- FedRAMP
- Cloud computing
