= Cloud-to-cloud integration =

Integration that allows users to connect disparate cloud computing platforms

Cloud-to-Cloud Integration ( C2I ) allows users to connect disparate cloud computing platforms. While Paas (Platform as a service) and Saas (Software as a service) continue to gain momentum, different vendors have different implementations for cloud computing, e.g. Database, REST, SOAP API.

Another name for Cloud-to-Cloud Integration is Cloud-Surfing.

See also Cloud-based integration
