= USS Turbot =

Two submarines of the United States Navy have been named USS Turbot for the turbot, a large, brown and white flatfish, valued as a food.

- USS Turbot (SS-31) was a G-class submarine which served before World War I. She was renamed G-3 before she was launched.
- USS Turbot (SS-427) was a Balao-class submarine that had not been completed at the end of World War II.
