= Turbot (business) =

Software company

Turbot HQ, Inc
- Company type: Privately held company
- Industry: Software
- Founded: 2014 (New Jersey)
- Founder: Nathan Wallace
- Headquarters: United States, United Kingdom, India, Australia
- Products: Turbot
- Number of employees: 65+
- Website: turbot.com

Turbot (Turbot HQ, Inc) is a privately held software company headquartered in the United States. Turbot provides automated cloud governance controls for enterprise cloud applications and infrastructure.

== History ==
Turbot was founded by Nathan Wallace in 2014 as a US Corporation based in NJ. In 2016 the company expanded its virtual office across varying US states. In 2017, Turbot announced an expansion in the United Kingdom (Turbot HQ Limited) and India (Turbot HQ India Private Limited). In 2018 Turbot expanded its footprint through multiple cities in India and started operations in Australia (Turbot HQ Private Limited).

Turbot provides real-time, automated configuration and control of software-defined infrastructure in cloud platforms. Turbot is an AWS Advanced Technology Partner with multiple certified competencies for Security, Cloud Management, Life Sciences, etc. Turbot is also a Microsoft Azure Partner and Google Cloud Platform partner, as well as a member of the Cloud Native Computing Foundation, Linux Foundation, and Center for Internet Security.

Turbot's Automated Governance Platform enables an enterprise cloud team to focus on delivering higher-level value while your development teams remain agile through use of native cloud tools. Turbot has varying Consulting, Managed Services, and Technology Integration partnerships providing varying use cases for partners to empower their services and capabilities.
