= Browser-based computing =

Browser-based computing is the use of the web browsers to perform computing tasks. Opportunities for computing on the Web have been noted as far back as 1997. Computing over the web was described in 2000. Applications include distributed computing for web workers as illustrated by James (formerly CrowdProcess) and HASH, the use of the browser's stack in QMachine, the embedding of web applications as semantic hypermedia components and the Signaling Server in Peer-to-peer networks set via WebRTC. Browser-based computing complements cloud computing, because they reduce server-side computational load, often using cloud-hosted, RESTful web services.
