= Victor Bahl =

American computer scientist

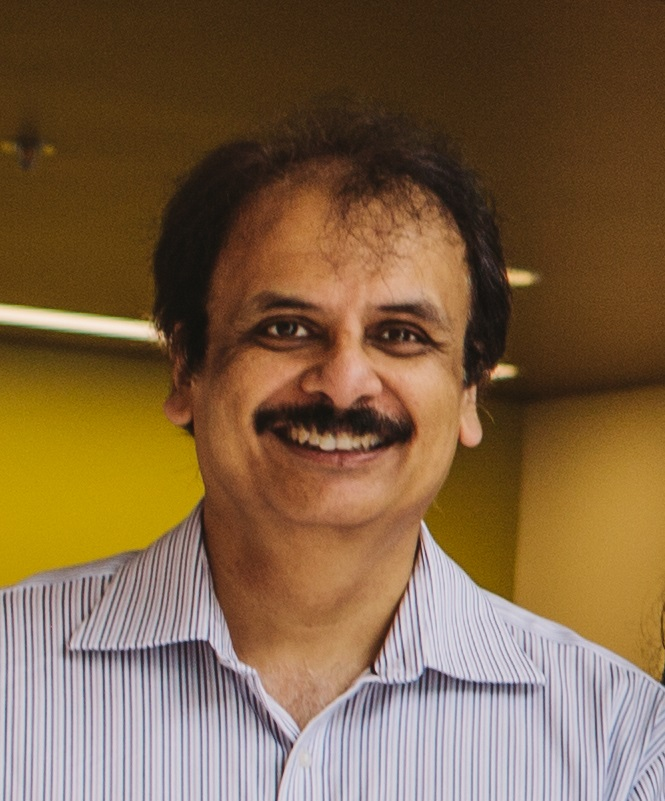
- Bahl in 2014
- Born: New Delhi
- Citizenship: US
- Education: University of Massachusetts, Amherst; Modern School, New Delhi
- Awards: Fellow of the ACM, IEEE, AAAS; ACM Distinguished Service Award; ACM SIGMOBILE Lifetime Achievement Award; FCC open Internet Applications Award
- Scientific career
- Fields: Computer science; electrical engineering
- Workplaces: Microsoft; Digital Equipment Corporation
- Doctoral advisor: Imrich Chlamtac

Victor Bahl (born 1964 (age 61–62)) is an American Technical Fellow and CTO of Azure for Operators at Microsoft. He started networking research at Microsoft. He is known for his research contributions to white space radio data networks, radio signal-strength based indoor positioning systems, multi-radio wireless systems, wireless network virtualization, edge computing, and for bringing wireless links into the datacenter. He is also known for his leadership of the mobile computing community as the co-founder of the ACM Special Interest Group on Mobility of Systems, Users, Data, and Computing (SIGMOBILE). He is the founder of international conference on Mobile Systems, Applications, and Services Conference (MobiSys), and the founder of ACM Mobile Computing and Communications Review, a quarterly scientific journal that publishes peer-reviewed technical papers, opinion columns, and news stories related to wireless communications and mobility. Bahl has received important awards; delivered dozens of keynotes and plenary talks at conferences and workshops; delivered over six dozen distinguished seminars at universities; written over hundred papers with more than 65,000 citations and awarded over 100 US and international patents. He is a Fellow of the Association for Computing Machinery, IEEE, and American Association for the Advancement of Science.

== Life in industry ==
Bahl began his professional career in 1988 as an engineer in the image processing research group at Digital Equipment Corporation in Maynard, Massachusetts. In 1990, he developed the computer industry's first video compression and image rendering software library that shipped with every Ultrix and VMS computer. Between 1990 and 1992, he worked on the Jvideo hardware prototype (and later the J300), a TURBOchannel based multimedia board for manipulating digital video on personal workstations. Following the success of these project, in 1993, he and his group shipped FullVideo and FullVideo Supreme, the IT industry's first multimedia hardware product for VAX-, Alpha-, and Pentium-based workstations. FullVideo used two C-Cube CL 550 chips for simultaneous compression and decompression of JPEG streams, a Motorola DSP5001 for CD quality audio, and a proprietary blue noise based image renderer. In 1994, Bahl was awarded a two-year doctoral fellowship from DEC, which enabled him to complete his PhD degree at the University of Massachusetts, Amherst. In 1997, he joined Microsoft Research in Redmond, Washington and developed the first Wi-Fi based indoor positioning system and the first public area Wi-Fi hot spot. In 2001 he formed the Networking Research Group and in 2010 the Mobility & Networking Research Group. His group is considered one of the strongest and most respected networking research group in the world. Bahl advises Microsoft's CEO and senior leadership team on long-term vision and strategy related to networking technologies. He and his group execute the strategy through research, technology transfers to product groups, industry partnerships, and associated policy engagement with governments and research institutions around the world. Over the years his group has developed technologies such as campus-wide white space networking, wireless zero-configuration, Native Wi-Fi, Virtual Wi-Fi, firmware TPM, and the Xbox wireless controller protocol. His group is also known for complete re-design of the Azure global data center network architecture and its foundational components, including Azure’s software load balancer, Azure’s software-defined wide-area network, Data Center TCP, and recently, Azure’s Remote Direct Memory Access network. In 2020, Victor moved to Azure for Operators as CTO. He is a thought leader of Microsoft's Azure for Operators strategy.

== Research contributions ==
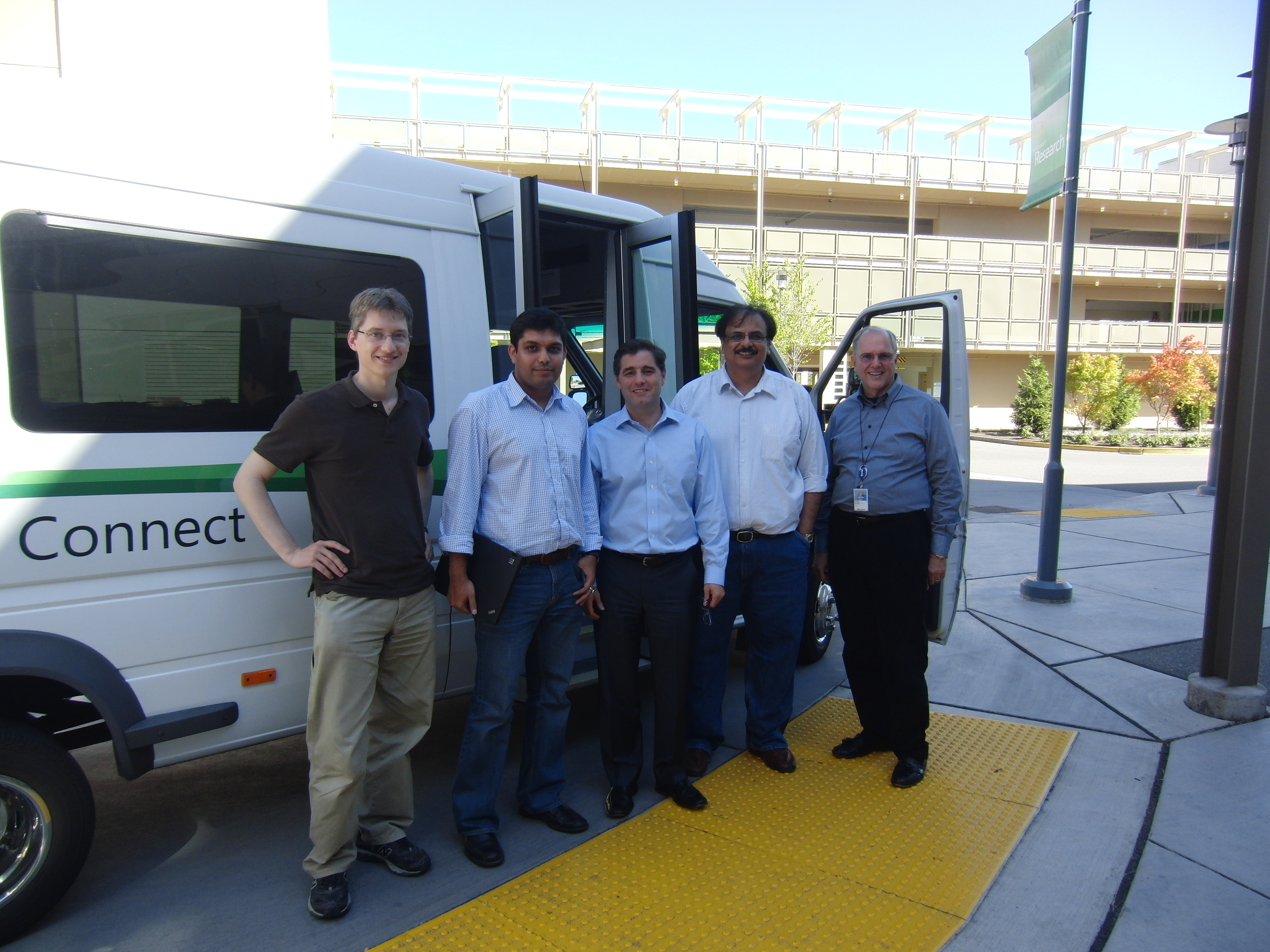
U.S. Federal Communications Commission chairman Julius Genachowski (middle) in front of the shuttle connected to the first white space radio network (Microsoft Research Redmond campus, Saturday, August 14, 2010). Also pictured is Microsoft's Chief Research and Strategy Officer Craig Mundie (far right).

=== White space radio communications ===
As leader of Microsoft's Networking over White Spaces (KNOWS) project, Bahl led a worldwide effort to harness relatively unused spectra (TV white space) using a fundamentally different approach (opportunistic sharing of spectrum) from previous allocations. In 2007 he and his group built the first TV white space radio, tested by the Federal Communications Commission; in 2009, they carried out some of the first US tests of whitespace radio communications; on April 7, 2010, as part of the IEEE DySPAN conference keynote talk, he announced the free availability of a white space spectrum database for research. On August 14, 2010, Bahl and Microsoft's Chief Research and Strategy Officer Craig Mundie hosted U.S. Federal Communications Commission (FCC) chairman Julius Genachowski and FCC managing director Steven Van Roekei on Microsoft's Redmond campus. During this meeting, Bahl presented the details of the white space networking technology and his group demonstrated the world's first campus-wide TV white space network. One month later, on September 23, 2010, the FCC made a historic ruling that opened up over 180 MHz of spectrum for unlicensed use in the United States and another subsequent ruling that made spectrum sensing a non-mandatory requirement, a decision expected to be the key reason for the success of this technology. Following the FCC's lead, spectrum regulatory bodies of several other countries passed similar rulings. Bahl's efforts were covered extensively by the mainstream media. He and his group published several seminal papers including a best paper in SIGCOMM 2009 titled “White Space Networking with Wi-Fi like Connectivity”. These publications triggered a wave of further research in dynamic spectrum access. Since then Bahl has continued to pursue this line of research, incorporating newer technologies such as smart antennas, MIMO, and software defined radios into wide area unlicensed networks.

=== Indoor positioning ===
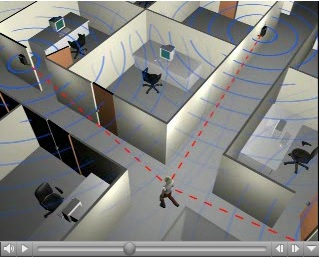
The RADAR indoor positioning system

Bahl developed the RADAR Indoor positioning system, the world's first RF signal strength based indoor location determination system. The basic premise of operation is to record signal strength information from multiple Wi-Fi access points into a database during an initial training phase. These signal strengths from nearby access points (a fingerprint) are then stored in a database. During operation, the mobile makes the same AP signal strength measurements and then queries the database to find the closest location match. Further refinements combine these empirical measurements with environmental profiling, mobility modeling, and topographical constraints to locate and track mobiles. Bahl and collaborators were awarded 12 U.S. and international patents for this work.

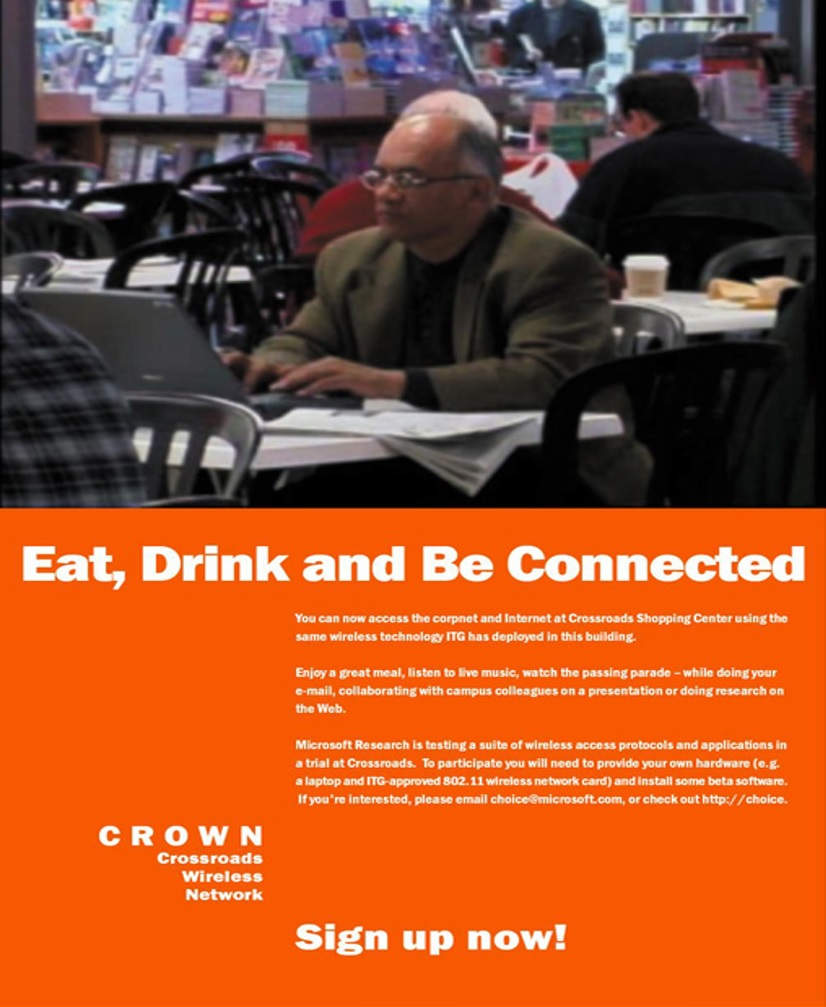
Poster advertising the first free public area Wi-Fi hot spot network (June 1999)

=== Wi-Fi public area hotspots ===
Bahl designed and deployed the world's first free public area Wi-Fi hotspot network in the Crossroads Shopping Center in Bellevue, Washington on 11 June 1999. The network known as CROWN, short for CROssroads Wireless Network, was operational for two years before being retired on 14 June 2001. At a time when the telecommunications industry was vigorously pushing 3G networks, CROWN demonstrated how Wi-Fi hotspots could be an inexpensive alternative to cellular Internet access. CROWN's edge server architecture supported important features such as network discovery, global authentication, differentiated services, last hop cryptographic security, and location-based services. The design and the accompanying protocols influenced Internet Engineering Task Force (IETF) working groups and companies deploying Wi-Fi hot-spots. The centralized dumb access point and smart switch architecture deployed in enterprise Wi-Fi networks can also be traced back to CROWN. Bahl published influential papers and was awarded several US patents for his inventions (United States patents: 6,834,341, 7,032,241, 7,089,415, 7,085,924, 7,149,896, 7,313,237, 7,406,707, 7,444,510, 7,444,669, 7,500,263, 7,548,976).

=== Wireless community meshes ===
Community-based multi-hop wireless networking is a disruptive force on mainstream DSL and cable modem wireline networks. In the true spirit of the Internet, it allows free flow of information without any moderation or selective rate control (see network neutrality). Between 2003 and 2007, Bahl and his team at Microsoft Research invented several important technologies that made wireless mesh networking feasible. Their research, which was highly publicized in mainstream press, popularized the idea of community networks that would grow organically when neighbors connect their home Wi-Fi networks together via wireless meshes. To mitigate the loss of throughput, which is fundamental in meshes with half-duplex radios, Bahl departed from the norm and became the first researcher to build wireless meshes with multi-radio nodes. Subsequently, his group developed multi-radio routing algorithms that took advantage of this to extract better performance. He also built networks that split the control and data plane into different frequencies and developed troubleshooting technologies that enabled them to self-manage and self-stabilize. In 2005 and 2007 he developed and distributed open source academic toolkits that were used as a teaching and research aid in over 1200 universities worldwide. He published several scientific papers, gave tutorials and keynote talks, and Microsoft licensed the technology to start-ups. To speed up adoption and provide broadband Internet access in rural areas with poor connectivity, in 2006 he helped launch Microsoft's Digital Inclusion Program that provided substantial funding for research and deployment of mesh networks. Bahl was awarded eight international patents pertaining to mesh networking.

=== Wireless network virtualization ===
Bahl and his brother Pradeep Bahl and (then) PhD candidate Ranveer Chandra co-invented wireless hardware virtualization, which enables a Wi-Fi card to give the illusion that it is connected to multiple wireless networks. The virtualization software resides below the network layer of the OSI network stack. It switches the hardware configuration rapidly and automatically causing it to connect to different networks. Switching speeds of 1 to 2 milliseconds and demand driven switching creates the illusion that the device is connected to multiple networks simultaneously. The first prototype, developed in 2002 was called MultiNet. Seven years later, in 2009, Microsoft shipped the technology as Virtual Wi-Fi to millions of users of its Windows operating system. Virtual Wi-Fi brought to life new scenarios such as concurrent connection – allowing a device to communicate over an ad hoc network while being connected to the infra-structure network. This technique is now often used with the widely popular Wi-Fi Direct. Virtual Wi-Fi also enabled Wi-Fi networks to extend their range as intermediate node(s) served as relay device(s). A third popular scenario allows bridging ad hoc networks to the Internet for the purpose of providing a localized Wi-Fi hot-spot. Initially released as a research prototype, software download of Multinet exceeded several hundred thousand making it one of the most popular software downloaded in Microsoft Research's history. Virtual Wi-Fi received many accolades from mainstream media and copycat versions have been incorporated into several other commercial operating systems.

=== Multi-radio wireless systems ===
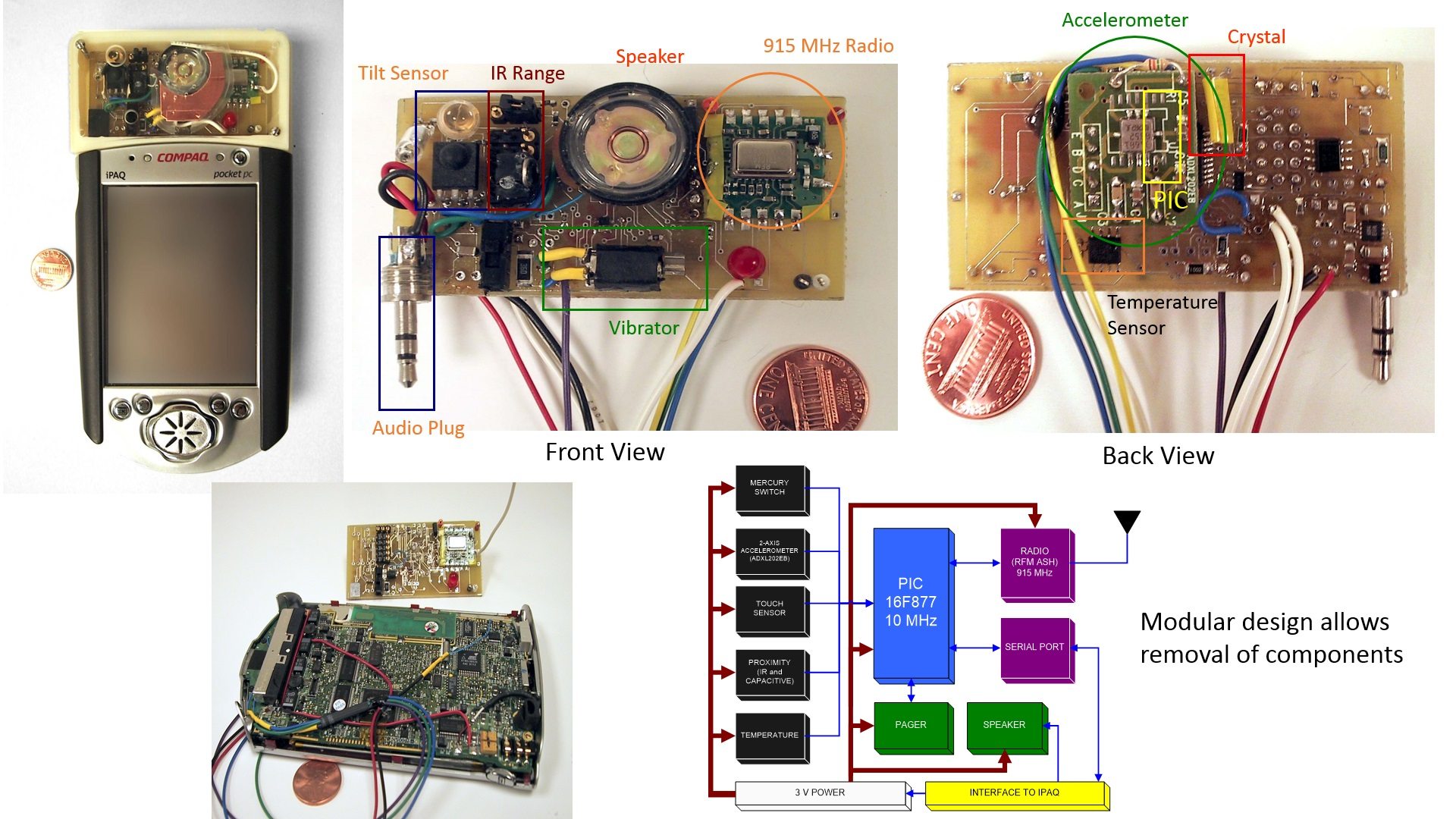
Hardware used to demonstrate performance improvement in systems with multiple radios (2002)

In 2001, Bahl developed the first multi-radio personal digital assistant (PDA). This precursor to modern smart phones used two different radios collaboratively to dramatically improve its network performance and Voice over IP functionality compared to the popular commercially available single radio wireless PDAs. The significant new design concept of using multiple radios with different characteristics in the same device was described in a 2002 MobiCom paper, where he and his co-authors showed how a low power radio, an RF Monolithics TR1000 ASH Transceiver, connected to a low power microcontroller, a Microchip PIC16LF877, could be used to wake-up the high-power device, a Compaq iPAQ H3650PDA equipped with a Cisco AIR-PCM350 802.11b wireless networking card, on an as needed basis. This configuration increased the overall battery lifetime of the iPAQ by up to 115% for typical users. Following this, between 2003 & 2005, Bahl wrote a series of research papers quantifying the advantages of using multiple radios in real-world wireless meshes and wireless LANs. In a 2004 paper titled, “Reconsidering wireless systems with multiple radios,” he proposed the design principle of separating control and data planes by assigning different radios to each. Bahl's designs have proliferated deeply into the computer and telecommunication industry. His early work opened up a new threads of research and products and for this he was awarded at least five US patents (7,065,376, 7,099,689, 7,283,834, 7,610,057, 8,078,208). Also, as of 2014, five of his papers on this topic have been cited over 2,100 times.

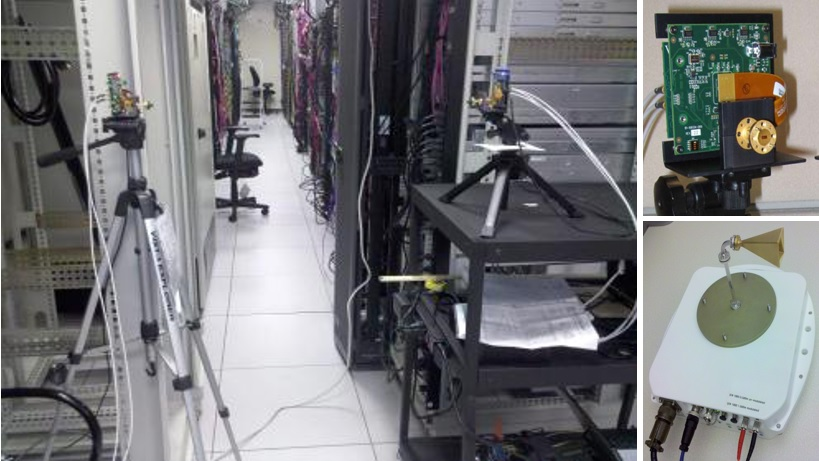
Programmatically maneuverable mm-wave wireless links provide additional network bandwidth to server racks at crunch time. Picture shows a 60 GHz radio frequency module and an experimental set up used to showcase this idea in a data center (October 2009).

=== Millimeter wave networking in data centers ===
In 2008-09, concerned about the rapidly growing demand for cloud computing, the IT industry was contemplating converting the prevalent multi-rooted tree based network topology, of oversubscribed data center networks, to a fat tree topology or to a non-blocking full bisection bandwidth clos topology. The difficulty was that re-hauling these networks with complex aggregate layer network switches, as required in a fat tree network topology, or with thousands of simpler commodity network switches inter-connected with miles of wires as required in a clos network topology, was very expensive. In a study of a production mega data center, published in Oct. 2009, Bahl, Kandula, and Padhye showed that barring a few outliers, traffic demands could be met in existing, slightly oversubscribed data center networks. Then, to manage the outliers, they augmented the small (i.e. low port density) network switches, commonly referred to as top-of-the-rack or ToR switches, which connect the server racks to the rest of the network, with extremely high frequency point-to-point radio frequency links. Notwithstanding concerns about link reliability due to interference, they used these short range, highly directional links advantageously, exploiting frequency_reuse to light-up many links concurrently and interference-free at multi-Gbps rates. The steerable radio beams provided additional inter-rack capacity on an as needed bases thus relieving congestion hot-spots. By building such a network, they became the first researchers to introduce mm-wave (60 GHz) wireless communications in data centers. Three years later, their invention was covered by The New York Times in an article published on January 14, 2012, titled “A wireless road around data traffic jams.” Others have followed up on their seminal work by developing similar networks.

== Professional service contributions ==
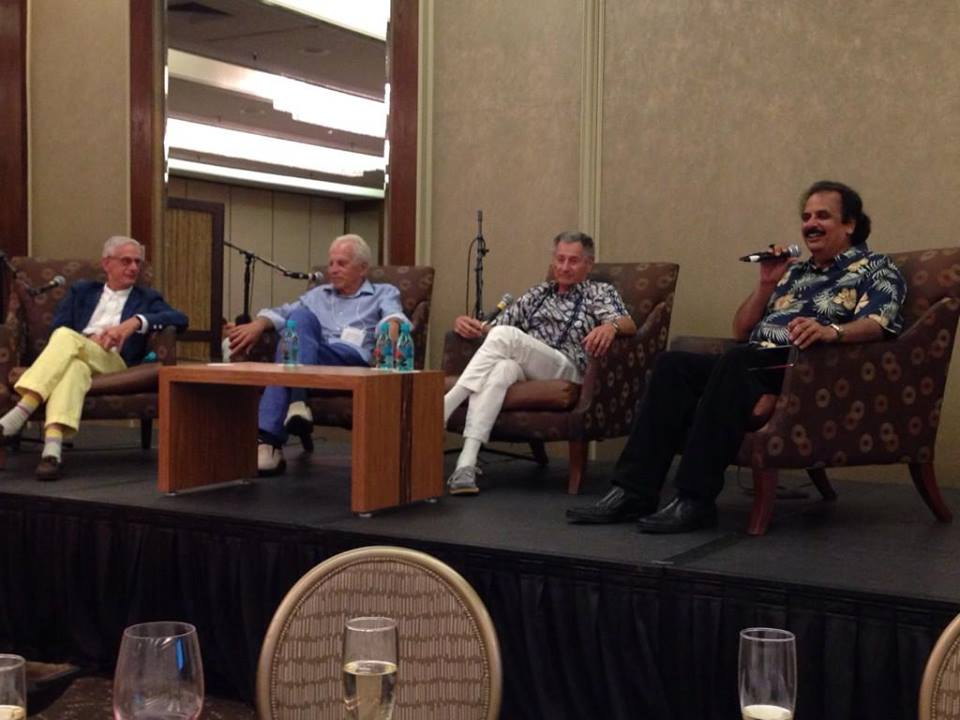
"Pioneers of Wireless Networking" panel celebrating 20 years of MobiCom. From left to right, SIGMOBILE Outstanding Contributions winners: Randy Katz, David Goodman, Len Kleinrock, and Victor Bahl.

Over the past 20 years, Bahl has been a keystone figure in the mobile computing research community, beginning with his 1995 co-founding (with Imrich Chlamtac) of ACM SIGMOBILE, the ACM's special interest group in mobility and tetherless ubiquitous connectivity. Under the auspices of SIGMOBILE, Bahl has served as steering committee chair of its flagship conference MobiCom, the International Conference on Mobile Computing and Networking, since 2001.

In 2003, Bahl brokered a deal between the two largest computer systems organizations (ACM and USENIX) to found MobiSys, The International Conference on Mobile Systems, Applications, and Services. MobiSys is now recognized as the most prestigious mobile systems venue in the world, evidenced by paper acceptance rates comparable to other top publication venues in computer science.

In 1996, Bahl founded ACM Mobile Computing and Communications Review, a quarterly scientific magazine/newsletter that publishes peer-reviewed technical papers, standards reports, RF related health articles, conference and workshop reports, opinion columns, news stories, and interviews related to mobility and wireless communications. The first issue was published in April 1997. He served as its first editor-in-chief till June 2001.

== Education ==
- 1997 PhD, Electrical and Computer Engineering, University of Massachusetts, Amherst. Thesis title: Real-Time Visual Communications over Narrowband Wireless Radio Networks. Doctoral fellow at Digital Equipment Corporation.
- Master of Science, Electrical and Computer Engineering, University at Buffalo. Thesis title: Recognition of Handwritten Script: A Hidden Markov Model Approach.
- Bachelor of Science, Electrical and Computer Engineering, University at Buffalo. Thesis title: Conic Shape Detection Using a Non-Linearized Iterative Approach.

== Awards and recognition ==
- In 1994, he received Digital Equipment Corporation's Doctoral Fellowship Award
- In 2001, he received ACM SIGMOBILE's Distinguished Service Award "In recognition of his passion about and effectiveness in advancing the interests of ACM SIGMOBILE and MobiCom”
- In 2003, he was inducted as a Fellow of the Association for Computing Machinery "for contributions to wireless systems, and for leadership in the mobile computing and communications community"
- In 2007, 2010 and 2011 he was awarded Microsoft's individual Performance Awards
- From 2007 to 2010, he served as ACM Distinguished Speaker and IEEE Communications Society's Distinguished Lecturer
- In 2008, he was inducted as a Fellow of the Institute of Electrical and Electronics Engineers "for contributions to the design of wireless networks and systems and leadership in mobile computing and communications"
- In 2008, he won the ACM International Conference on emerging Networking EXperiments and Technologies (CoNEXT) Best Paper Award for his paper “Opportunistic Use of Client Repeaters to Improve Performance of WLANs”
- In 2009, he won ACM SIGCOMM Best Paper Award for his paper "White Space Networking with Wi-Fi like Connectivity"
- In 2010, he was inducted as a Fellow of the American Association for the Advancement of Science “for distinguished contributions to the field of mobile systems and for passionate visionary leadership of the mobile computing community”
- In 2010, he won the IEEE Region 6 Outstanding Engineer Award
- In 2011, he won the U.S. Federal Communications Commission open Internet Applications and FCC People's Choice Awards for “MobiPerf, a network measurement system for cellular networks”
- In 2012, he was named a Distinguished Alumnus of University of Massachusetts, Amherst
- In 2013, he was named by the Association for Computing Machinery as the recipient of SIGMOBILE Outstanding Contributions (Lifetime Achievement) Award “for pioneering contributions to wireless Internet broadband technologies, and for inspirational leadership of the mobile computing community”
- In 2013 he won the IEEE Region 6 Outstanding Leadership and Professional Service Award
- In 2013, he won the ACM Mobile Systems, Applications and Services (MobiSys) Best Paper Award for his paper “Energy Characterization and Optimization of Image Sensing Toward Continuous Mobile Vision”
- In 2019, he received Association for Computing Machinery (ACM) Distinguished Service Award for “significant and lasting service to the broad community of mobile computing and wireless networking, and for building strong linkages between academia, industry, and government agencies.”
- In 2019, he was promoted to Technical Fellow at Microsoft. He was the only Technical Fellow at Microsoft Research Redmond Lab at that time.
