= Yingying Chen =

American computer scientist

- Born: Shanghai, China
- Citizenship: United States
- Education: Nanjing University (BS); North Carolina State University (MS); Rutgers University (PhD)
- Known for: Mobile sensing; wireless sensing; mobile and IoT security
- Awards: National Science Foundation CAREER Award (2010); Innovator Award, New Jersey Inventors Hall of Fame (2012); Fellow of the Institute of Electrical and Electronics Engineers (IEEE) (2020); Fellow of the National Academy of Inventors (NAI) (2022); Fellow of the American Association for the Advancement of Science (ACM) (2023); Fellow of the American Association for the Advancement of Science (AAAS) (2025)
- Scientific career
- Fields: Mobile computing; Internet of Things; Wireless sensing; Computer security
- Workplaces: Rutgers University
- Website: www.winlab.rutgers.edu/~yychen

Yingying (Jennifer) Chen is a computer scientist whose research involves mobile computing, the Internet of Things, the security and privacy of mobile technologies, including sensors, smartphones, wearables, and activity trackers, and artificial intelligence. She is a Distinguished Professor, Peter D. Cherasia Faculty Scholar, and chair of the Department of Electrical and Computer Engineering at Rutgers University. Chen is also associate director of WINLAB (Wireless Information Network Laboratory) and director of the Data Analysis and Information Security (DAISY) Lab.

Chen is a Fellow of the American Association for the Advancement of Science (AAAS), the Association for Computing Machinery (ACM), the Institute of Electrical and Electronics Engineers (IEEE), and the National Academy of Inventors (NAI).

== Early life and education ==
Chen grew up in Nanjing, China. Both of her parents were physicists and professors in the Physics Department at Nanjing University. She attended Nanjing Jinling High School for six years, from middle school through high school. Chen developed an interest in physics while in high school and studied condensed matter physics as an undergraduate at Nanjing University.

Chen received a B.S. in physics from Nanjing University. She later earned an M.S. in computer science from North Carolina State University while pursuing doctoral studies in physics at North Carolina State University. She completed a Ph.D. in computer science at Rutgers University.

== Career ==
Chen worked at AT&T from 1994 to 2000 and later at Alcatel-Lucent, now part of Nokia, from 2000 to 2007 as a senior member of technical staff and team lead in optical networking and network-management systems.

In 2007, she joined the Department of Electrical and Computer Engineering at the Stevens Institute of Technology, where she received early promotion twice and became professor in 2015. She became the Founding Director of the Data Analysis and Information Security (DAISY) Laboratory.

Chen joined Rutgers University in 2017 as a professor in the Department of Electrical and Computer Engineering. She became Associate Director of the Wireless Information Network Laboratory and continued to direct the Data Analysis and Information Security (DAISY) Laboratory. In 2022, she became Chair of the Department of Electrical and Computer Engineering. She is a Distinguished Professor and Peter D. Cherasia Faculty Scholar at Rutgers University.

== Research ==
Chen's research is in AI-driven mobile computing and sensing, the Internet of Things (IoT), security in artificial-intelligence and machine-learning systems, smart healthcare, and on-device artificial intelligence.

Chen holds multiple patents, several of which have been licensed to industry.

Her work has examined mobile and wireless sensing for driver-safety and health-monitoring applications. In a 2011 ACM MobiCom paper, Chen and collaborators described a system for distinguishing driver phone use from passenger phone use through acoustic ranging using a vehicle's speakers. She has also co-authored systems that use smartphones and off-the-shelf Wi-Fi for sleep-related monitoring.

Chen has also studied privacy and security risks associated with mobile and wearable systems. In 2016, she and collaborators published work showing that sensor data from wearable devices could be used to infer personal identification numbers entered on keypads.

Her wireless-sensing research has included the use of commodity Wi-Fi signals to detect suspicious objects in baggage. Rutgers described the system as a potential low-cost screening approach for public venues such as schools, museums, stadiums, and theme parks. Chen has continued this work through a NSF-funded project aimed at developing a low-cost, portable Wi-Fi system for detecting suspicious objects concealed in baggage.

== Books ==
- Guo, Xiaonan; Wang, Yan; Cheng, Jerry; Chen, Yingying (2024). Mobile Technologies for Smart Healthcare System Design. Cham: Springer. doi:10.1007/978-3-031-57345-3. ISBN 978-3-031-57344-6.
- Chen, Yingying; Wu, Jie; Yu, Paul; Wang, Xiaogang, eds. (2024). Network Security Empowered by Artificial Intelligence. Cham: Springer. doi:10.1007/978-3-031-53510-9. ISBN 978-3-031-53509-3.
- Yu, Jiadi; Chen, Yingying; Xu, Xiangyu (2018). Sensing Vehicle Conditions for Detecting Driving Behaviors. Cham: Springer. doi:10.1007/978-3-319-89770-7. ISBN 978-3-319-89769-1.
- Yang, Jie; Chen, Yingying; Trappe, Wade; Cheng, Jerry (2014). Pervasive Wireless Environments: Detecting and Localizing User Spoofing. Cham: Springer. doi:10.1007/978-3-319-07356-9. ISBN 978-3-319-07355-2.
- Chen, Yingying; Xu, Wenyuan; Trappe, Wade; Zhang, Yanyong (2009). Securing Emerging Wireless Systems: Lower-layer Approaches. New York: Springer. doi:10.1007/978-0-387-88491-2. ISBN 978-0-387-88490-5.

=== Book chapters ===
- Xie, Yucheng; Guo, Xiaonan; Wang, Yan; Cheng, Jerry; Chen, Yingying (2024). "Universal Targeted Adversarial Attacks Against mmWave-Based Human Activity Recognition". In Chen, Yingying; Wu, Jie; Yu, Paul; Wang, Xiaogang (eds.). Network Security Empowered by Artificial Intelligence. Cham: Springer. pp. 177–211. doi:10.1007/978-3-031-53510-9_7.
- Liu, Hongbo; Wang, Yan; Liu, Jian; Chen, Yingying (2019). "Proactive User Authentication Using WiFi Signals in Dynamic Networks". In Wang, Cliff; Lu, Zhuo (eds.). Proactive and Dynamic Network Defense. Cham: Springer. pp. 223–248. doi:10.1007/978-3-030-10597-6_9.
- Chen, Yingying; Yang, Jie (2012). "Defending Against Identity-Based Attacks in Wireless Networks". In Das, Sajal K.; Kant, Krishna; Zhang, Nan (eds.). Handbook on Securing Cyber-Physical Critical Infrastructure. Morgan Kaufmann. pp. 191–222. doi:10.1016/B978-0-12-415815-3.00008-X.
- Yang, Jie; Chen, Yingying; Martin, Richard P.; Trappe, Wade; Gruteser, Marco (2011). "On the Performance of Wireless Indoor Localization Using Received Signal Strength". In Zekavat, Seyed A.; Buehrer, R. Michael (eds.). Handbook of Position Location: Theory, Practice, and Advances. Wiley-IEEE Press. Chapter 12.
- Chen, Yingying; Yang, Jie; Trappe, Wade; Martin, Richard P. (2011). "Impact of Anchor Placement and Anchor Selection on Localization Accuracy". In Zekavat, Seyed A.; Buehrer, R. Michael (eds.). Handbook of Position Location: Theory, Practice, and Advances. Wiley-IEEE Press. pp. 425–455. doi:10.1002/9781119434610.ch13.

== Honors and awards ==
- IEEE Outstanding Contribution Award, IEEE NJ Coast Section (2005–2009)
- National Science Foundation Faculty Early Career Development (CAREER) Award (2010)
- Google Faculty Research Award (2010)
- Best Paper Award, ACM International Conference on Mobile Computing and Networking (MobiCom) (2011)
- Innovator Award, New Jersey Inventors Hall of Fame (2012)
- Henry Morton Distinguished Teaching Professor Award, Stevens Institute of Technology (2017)
- Best Paper Award, IEEE Conference on Communications and Network Security (CNS) (2018)
- Fellow of the Institute of Electrical and Electronics Engineers (IEEE) (2020)
- Fellow of the Asia-Pacific Artificial Intelligence Association (AAIA) (2021)
- Fellow of the National Academy of Inventors (NAI) (2022)
- Fellow of the Association for Computing Machinery (ACM) (2023)
- Rutgers Provost Faculty Excellence Award for Pioneering Research (2024)
- Fellow of the American Association for the Advancement of Science (AAAS) (2025)
