= Mobile Computing and Communications Review =

- Discipline: Mobile computing
- Language: English
- Edited by: Suman Banerjee

Publication details
- History: 1997–present
- Publisher: Association for Computing Machinery
- Frequency: Quarterly

Standard abbreviations
- ISO 4: Mob. Comput. Commun. Rev.

Indexing
- ISSN: 1559-1662 (print); 1931-1222 (web)

Links
- Journal homepage

Mobile Computing and Communications Review (MC2R) is a peer-reviewed quarterly scientific journal and newsletter published by the ACM SIGMOBILE covering mobile computing and networking. The purpose of the journal is the rapid publication of completed or in-progress technical work, including articles dealing with both research and practice. The journal also covers the status of major international standards in the field, and news of conferences and other events.

The current title is GetMobile

== Indexing ==
As of 2017, it is not indexed by Scopus.
