= Historical significance =

Historiographical concept

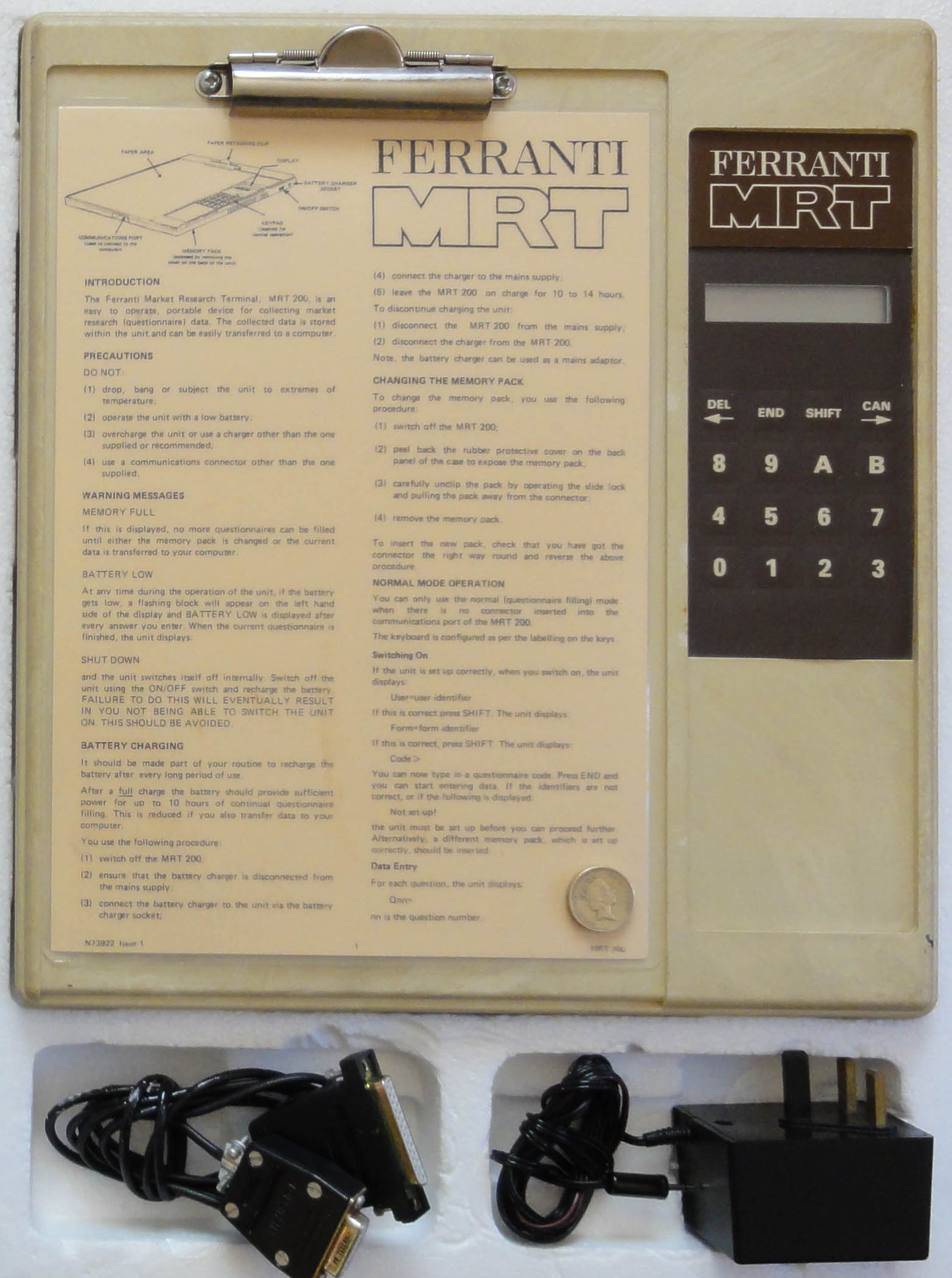
Some would say the Ferranti MRT is "just" a clipboard with a built in calculator, but others claim it has historical significance as "the world's first application-specific handheld computer".

Historical significance is a historiographical key concept that explores and seeks to explain the selection of particular social and cultural past events for remembrance by human societies. This element of selection involved in both ascribing and analyzing historical significance is one factor in making the discipline of history distinct from the past. Historians consider knowledge of dates and events within and between specific historical periods the primary content of history, also known as "first-order knowledge" or substantive concepts. In contrast, historical significance is an example of a subject specific secondary key concept or "second-order knowledge" also known as a meta-concept, or disciplinary concept, which is typically used to help organize knowledge within a subject area, frame suitable areas of inquiry, provide the framework upon which substantive knowledge can be built, and map learner progression within a subject discipline. Specifically with regards to historical significance, the way dates and events are chosen and ascribed relative significance is not fixed and can change over time according to which criteria were used to form the judgement of significance as well as how those criteria were chosen themselves in the first place. This aspect to significance has been described as:

“a flexible relationship between us and the past”.

Historical significance is often regarded as involving judging why a particular person or event is remembered and why another is not, it is this aspect of reasoned and evaluative judgement about historical significance that makes history writing differ from being simply a record of past events.

"as soon as we turn to questions of significance—of why something happened versus the mere fact of its happening—history becomes an act of judgment."

This emphasis on exploring what has been deemed significant by certain societies in contrast to what has been left out of the historical record has led to historical significance often being paired with the concept of historical silence, which looks at why and how certain social class, racial, and/or ethnic groups have not featured in the historical record or whose contributions have not been seen as significant at particular times, and in particular contexts. Thus historical significance is not an intrinsic or fixed property of a particular historical event but rather more of an assessment of who, why, and how that event was judged significant enough to be remembered. With this potential fluidity in mind, it therefore follows that any assessment of historical significance should not be seen as fixed or permanent.

"historical significance is not an enduring or unchanging characteristic of any particular event. It is a contingent quality that depends on the perspective from which that event is subsequently viewed."

== Relevance ==
A key concept for the study of history and public life in most societies regardless of topic, historical significance makes judgements about what is important to be remembered about the past and why, through its reflections on historical aspects of contemporary culture and society including historical reputations, events, issues, monuments, and what is chosen to be emphasized in history writing itself. Examining what has been included and what has been left out of the historical record can be an effective tool for guiding students to understand how cultural background affects their perception of history. The teaching of how to assess what has been considered significant and what has been left out has been described as:

"surely a fundamental corner-stone of a liberal and democratic education and a pre-requisite for effective citizenship."

The relevance of historical significance can also be demonstrated by its near ubiquitous appearance in provincial, national, and international history curricula including, but not limited to: the Singapore National Curriculum, the English National Curriculum, the IB Diploma History Guide, the New Zealand National Curriculum, and the Australian National Curriculum.

== Definitions ==
There are many definitions of historical significance. For example, UNESCO includes any site as a world heritage site, provided it:

"bear[s] a unique or at least exceptional testimony to a cultural tradition or to a civilization".

Other notable examples include the following, the International Baccalaureate Diploma History Guide which includes historical significance as one of its six historical concepts alongside the other five: Perspectives, Change, Continuity, Causation and Consequence. The IBO define historical significance as including:

"the record that has been preserved through evidence or traces of the past, and/or the aspects that someone has consciously decided to record and communicate".

This definition has overlaps with that provided by the Historical Thinking Project which includes significance as one of its six key concepts of historical thinking:

"A historical person or event can acquire significance if we, the historians, can link it to larger trends and stories that reveal something important for us today".

== Criteria for assessing historical significance ==
Historical significance is typically assessed by judging an event against pre-defined criteria and numerous criteria for assessing historical significance have been proposed. However, these criteria are always subjective, and therefore debatable. There can also be important differences between what is seen as significant in terms of the dominant national narratives of particular countries, what is taught in schools, and how certain groups such as minority groups may see the significance of a particular event. Thus describing any event as historically significant or non-significant remains open to challenge. Typically, significance teaching models are not designed to be used as checklists but rather, as unique disciplinary lenses or principles for examining relative historical significance commonly attached to a historical event or historical personage's actions. These could include different subdivisions of significance such as: contemporary significance, causal significance, pattern significance, symbolic significance, revelatory significance, and present significance.
