= Ferranti MRT =

Application-specific handheld computer

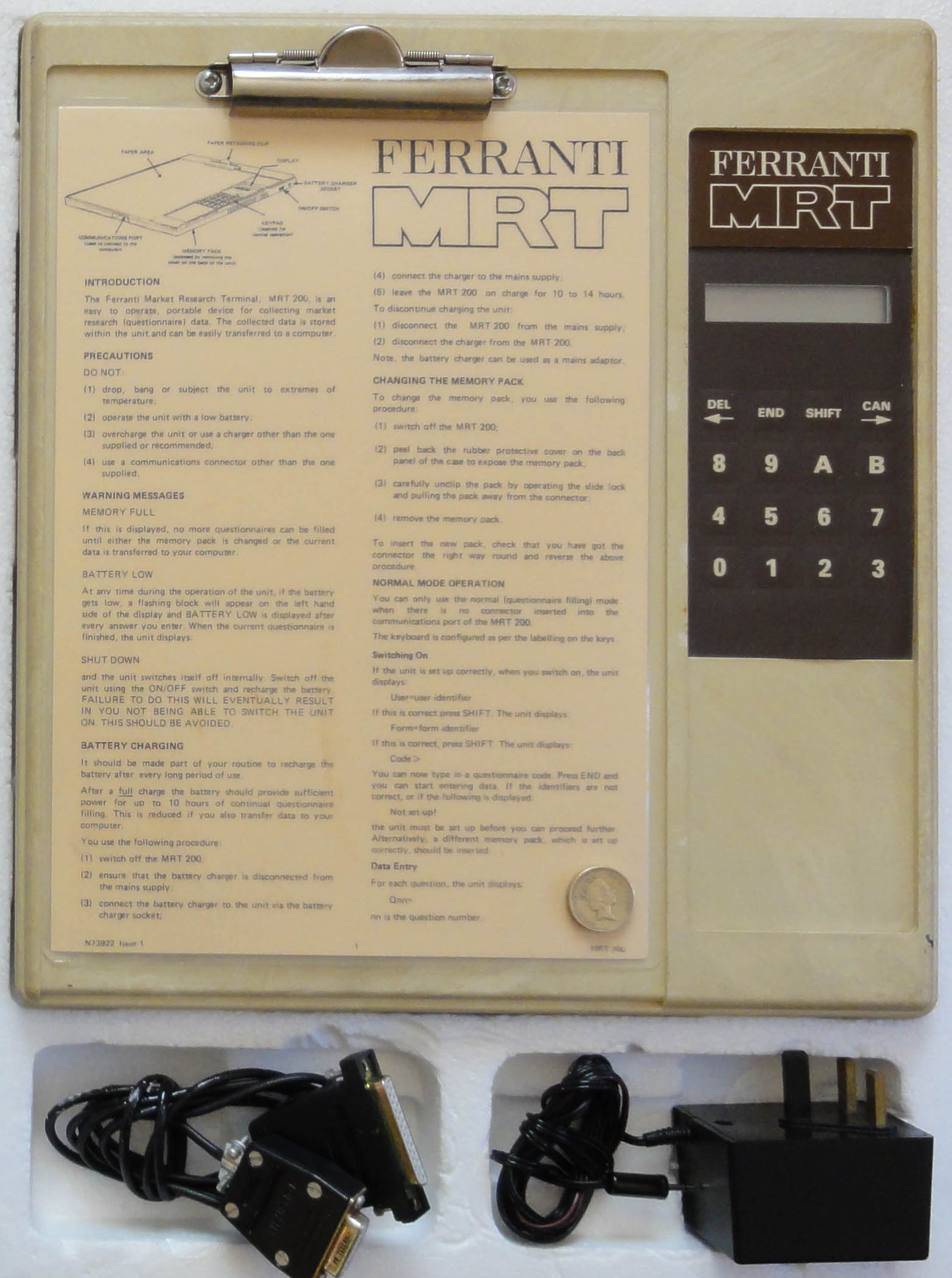
The Ferranti MRT-100

The Ferranti Market Research Terminal (MRT) was, arguably, the world’s first application-specific handheld computer. It was designed specifically for the market research sector as a means to augment the regular clipboard schemes that, at the time, were common-place, in social and market research. Despite having an appearance of a calculator built into a clipboard, the reality was that the unit contained a sophisticated form of programmable data-logger that, in response to an interviewer reading questions to the interviewee, had answers digitally recorded (for later uploading and analysis) via pressing appropriate keys on the unit. The unit contained a bespoke operating system to support field based market research. The Ferranti Market Research Terminal (MRT) is also of historical significance to the computing industry since it marked the last original computer design from Ferranti, a long established business (started 1882) that had risen to fame through a collaboration Manchester University to produce the "Mark 1", the world’s first commercial computer and later with Cambridge University producing the "Atlas" and "Titan" computers which, at their peak, held around 25% of the computing market.

== History ==
Ferranti Plc produced two versions that were labelled the MRT-100 and MRT-200 and based on an original 1978 prototype called the Questronic which had been designed at Sheffield University as part of a collaboration between the Department of Electronics and Electrical Engineering and the Department of Geography. While it is difficult to imagine the context of this product development in the late seventies, the IBM PC (which has brought the Windows desktops and laptops that are now commonplace) was only introduced on 12 August 1981. If one ignores calculators, then handheld computers appeared in July 1980 with, perhaps, the first being the Tandy Pocket Computer (Radio Shack TRS-80 Pocket Computer). Later in the same year, Matsushita (now the Panasonic Corporation) produced a handheld computer marketed under the Panasonic and Quasar brand. However, these devices were, of course, general purpose handheld computers unlike the application-specific MRT introduced by Ferranti. A merger in 1989 with the American "International Signal & Control Group" (ISC), led to Ferranti going into bankruptcy in December 1994. With that came the end of the Ferranti MRT and, effectively, Ferranti with its long lineage of UK innovative computing and electronics research, development and manufacture.

== Product Description ==
A description of the Ferranti MRT was given by Deborah Martell (Cardiff Business School, University of Wales Institute of Science and Technology) in the 1987 book, "Management Information Systems: The Technology Challenge" (edited by Nigel Piercy) in which she described the product as follows: "Accurate survey research is of utmost importance in marketing evaluations and NIT [new information technology] is improving this accuracy all the time. This has been shown by Rowley et-al in their description of the Questronic project at the University of Sheffield. The first commercialised product to evolve from this is the Ferranti Market Research Terminal (MRT). The MRT is a battery-operated, hand-held, data-capture terminal, which is an electronic replacement for the clipboard and pencil used for gathering information from consumers. This innovation offers real advantages for survey research, due to easier processing, since data is stored electronically, it is already in a form which can be directly entered into a computer. Likewise, the elimination of the data preparation stage decreases the errors created by human processing. More importantly survey results can be more topical since the MRT decreases the time delay in preparation. Other benefits accrue from decreased handling and stationary costs and increased interviewer productivity. Indeed the Questronic MRT procedures, with their instant processing abilities, allow more specific monitoring of TV effects. A particular attraction is the removal of the traditional “bottleneck” at the data preparation stage for input into the computer. Successful companies will, in the future, emphasise even more the matching of a product to the consumer requirements. Consequently, the old Henry Ford adage “you can have any colour you want, as long as its black” will be gone forever."

Perhaps the only thing to add to Deborah Martell’s description was that the MRT supported the easy transmission of collected data through telephone lines using a portable modem which, at the time, was cutting edge technology. To put these developments into context, the Internet was only commercialized in 1995 when NSFNET was decommissioned and the last barriers to using it for commercial purposes were removed (so the Ferranti MRT was in use for over 10 years before the commercial Internet).

== See also ==
- Ferranti
- Ferranti Mark 1
- Ferranti Titan
- Ferranti Atlas
- History of computing
- Market research
- Opinion polls
- Clipboard
- Mobile computing
