= MobiCom =

MobiCom may refer to:

- Mobi.com, a wireless carrier based in Hawaiʻi
- MobiCom, the International Conference on Mobile Computing and Networking
- Mobicom Corporation, a mobile phone network in Mongolia
