= SIGMOBILE =

SIGMOBILE is the Association for Computing Machinery's Special Interest Group on Mobility of Systems, Users, Data and Computing, which specializes in the field of mobile computing and wireless networks and wearable computing.

Conceived in early 1995, ACM SIGMOBILE started out as an organization that fostered research in the "field of mobility and tetherless ubiquitous connectivity". It was founded as a provisional SIG on June 13, 1996, gaining permanent status on October 12, 2000. On February 8, 2005, the SIGMOBILE Chapter Program was launched. The NTU Singapore chapter became the first Student Chapter, and the Sydney, Australia Chapter became the first Professional Chapter.

SIGMOBILE sponsors four annual international conferences: MobiCom, the International Conference on Mobile Computing and Networking; MobiHoc, the International Symposium on Mobile Ad Hoc Networking and Computing; MobiSys, the International Conference on Mobile Systems, Applications, and Services; and SenSys, the ACM Conference on Embedded Networked Sensor Systems. SIGMOBILE publishes a quarterly journal, Mobile Computing and Communications Review (MC2R), as well as the annual Proceedings of the conferences and many workshops sponsored by SIGMOBILE such as HotMobile, the International Workshop on Mobile Computing Systems and Applications.
