= Clipboard =

Thin, rigid board with a clip at the top for holding paper

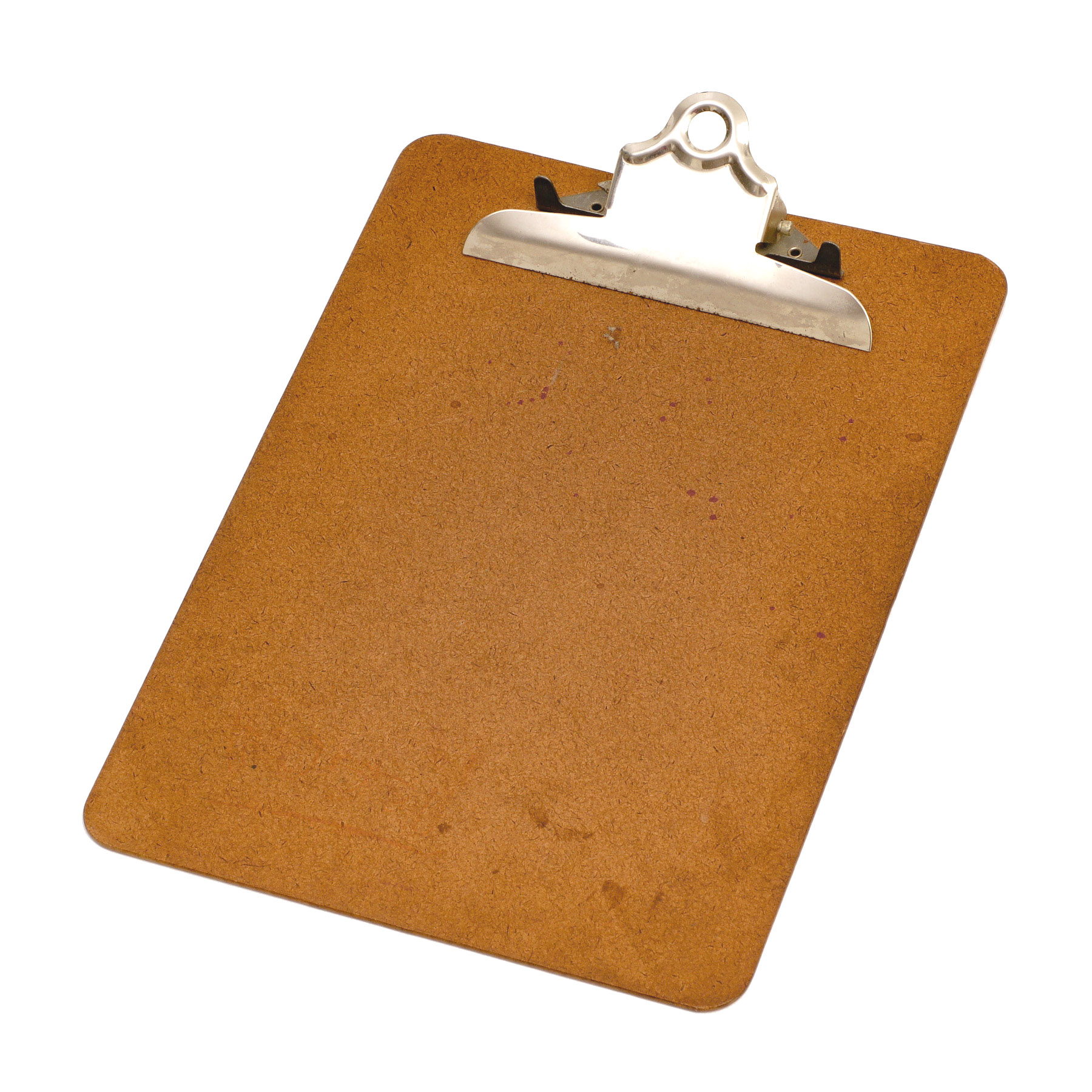
A hardboard clipboard

A clipboard is a thin, rigid writing board with a clip at the top for holding paper in place. A clipboard is typically used to support paper with one hand while writing on it with the other, especially when other writing surfaces are not available. The earliest forms were patented in 1870–1871 and referred to as board clips. Another early version of the clipboard, known as the "memorandum file", was invented by American inventor George Henry Hohnsbeen in 1921, for which he was granted U.S. patent 1,398,591. Related to the clipboard is the Shannon Arch File, which was developed around 1877.

== Variations ==
Clipboards can be constructed from a variety of material, including but not limited to, hardboard, aluminum, PVC, polypropylene, and high impact polystyrene. Clipboards generally come in two different designs—single or folding. Single clipboards are the more traditional type and consist of a single piece of rigid material and some sort of fixing mechanism along the top. Folding clipboards are usually constructed from a single piece of flexible PVC with two rigid materials enclosed within. A folding hinge connects the two sections to allow the front to be folded over the content to provide protection and often to allow some sort of promotional print or instructions. Folding clipboards also provide additional benefits because of the extra space available, allowing the incorporation of pen holders and pockets for storage. The arrival of the microprocessor and Internet age gave rise to high-tech variants of the traditional clipboard, the first being the Ferranti Market Research Terminal that retained a clip, to hold A4 paper sheets (looking like a large clipboard) but recording answers to questions in its electronic memory.

=== Storage clipboards ===
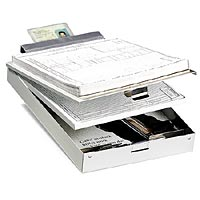
A storage clipboard

Storage clipboards have one or more compartments designed for paperwork, both to allow for easy transport of needed papers, and to protect those papers. They may also feature one or several compartments for writing implements. Some versions feature a hinged panel to slide between portions of a two-sided multi-part form.
