= Imrich Chlamtac =

Imrich Chlamtac was born in Zlaté Moravce, Slovakia, where in 2015, he received an Honorary Citizenship. Professor Chlamtac is the President of EAI, the European Alliance For Innovation, a private non-profit organization hosting conferences Through its international presence and being the largest European professional community in information technologies and their applications, EAI is dedicated to making information technologies a catalyst for the improvement of society, to advance worldwide research communities and help professionals build their career in an open, innovative community driven environment. As Founding President of CREATE-NET, he led the organization to international recognition as one of the leading European research organizations in communications.

== Education ==
Imrich Chlamtac holds a Ph.D. in Computer Science from the University of Minnesota (1979).

== Honorary appointments and international awards ==
In 1993 Chlamtac was elected Fellow of the IEEE - For contributions to the design and analysis of channel control protocols and their application to communication networks. and in 1997 he became a Fellow of the Association for Computing Machinery (ACM) for introducing the concept of lightpaths, the foundation for today's optical WDM networks. In 1994 he received the Fulbright Scholarship.

Chlamtac holds several honorary appointments including the Bruno Kessler Honorary Professor, University of Trento, Italy, the Sackler Professorship at Tel Aviv University, Honorary Professorship at the Beijing University of Posts and Telecommunications, the "University Professorship" at the Budapest University of Technology and Economics (BUTE), Hungary, a Doctor of the Hungarian Academy of Sciences and Honorary Membership of the BUTE Senate.

He is the 2001 recipient of the ACM Award for Outstanding Contributions to Research on Mobility and the 2002 recipient of the IEEE Communications Society Technical Committee (TC Wireless) Award for Outstanding Technical Contributions to Wireless Personal Communications. Dr. Chlamtac is a winner of the New Talents in Simulations Award from the Society of Computer Simulation for the concept of network emulators (1980) and the recipient of multiple ACM and an SPIE best paper awards. He has lectured worldwide as IEEE Distinguished Lecturer (1993 and 2000–2001), and was the plenary and keynote speaker at leading conferences.

== Industries ==
Dr. Chlamtac was recruited by the University of Texas at Dallas, UTD in Fall 1996 to build a bridge to Telecom Corridor, the largest concentration of telecommunications companies in USA. As Distinguished Chair in Telecommunications endowed professor, the Director of CATSS, and Associate Provost for Research, he was instrumental in building up one of the largest industry-university partnerships funded through TexTec and other successful initiatives. During his tenure at UTD Prof. Chlamtac contributed key concepts to research activities development leading to the University of Texas at Dallas no. 1 place in the United States among universities founded less than 50 years ago in the Times Higher Education ranking.

Earlier on, from 1987–1994, he was a professor at the University of Massachusetts Amherst and at Boston University from 1995–1997. From 1981–1987.

Dr. Chlamtac is the co-founder and past President of Consip Ltd, the first network emulator company, and of BCN System House Ltd. which was merged into KFKI System Integration Co. Ltd., one of the largest system integrator companies in central Europe.

== Research ==
Dr. Chlamtac is the inventor of multiple fundamental concepts in networking and communications in areas of optical networks and mobility. Dr. Chlamtac is also the founding Editor in Chief of the ACM/Springer Wireless Networks (WINET), the ACM/Springer Journal on Special Topics in Mobile Networks and Applications (MONET). He served on the editorial board of multiple top journals in networks, including IEEE Transactions on Communications, and others.

== Publications ==
Dr. Chlamtac published over 400 papers throughout his research career.

He is the co-author of multiple Books, Book and Encyclopedias Chapters, including the first textbook on LAN-s entitled "Local Networks: Motivation, Technology and Performance", "Broadband Services to Businesses and Communities" and the "Wireless and Mobile Network Architectures", which is an IEEE Network Editor's choice, as well as Amazon.com engineering books best-seller.
