= International Conference on Mobile Computing and Networking =

ACM annual conference series on mobile computing

MobiCom, the International Conference on Mobile Computing and Networking, is a series of annual conferences sponsored by ACM SIGMOBILE dedicated to addressing the challenges in the areas of mobile computing and wireless and mobile networking. Although no rating system for computer networking conferences exists, MobiCom is generally considered the best conference in these areas, and as of May 2003 it was the fifth highest-impact venue in computer science. Since 2010, MobiCom's peer review acceptance rate has been around 15%.

MobiCom Conferences have been held at the following locations:

- 2025, Hong Kong, China, 4–8 November 2025
- 2024, Washington, D.C., United States, 18–22 November 2024
- 2023, Madrid, Spain, 2–6 October 2023
- 2022, Sydney, Australia, 17–21 October 2022
- 2021, New Orleans, United States, 28 March – 1 April 2022 (Note: Delayed to 2022 due to the SARS-CoV-2 Omicron variant)
- 2020, London, United Kingdom, 14–18 September 2020 (Note: Held virtually due to COVID-19 lockdowns and travel restrictions)
- 2019, Los Cabos, Mexico, 21–25 October 2019
- 2018, New Delhi, India, 29 October – 2 November 2018
- 2017, Snowbird, Utah, United States, 16–20 October 2017
- 2016, New York City, United States, 3–7 October 2016
- 2015, Paris, France, 7–11 September 2015
- 2014, Maui, Hawaii, United States, 7–11 September 2014
- 2013, Miami, Florida, United States, 30 September – 4 October 2013
- 2012, Istanbul, Turkey, 22–26 August 2012
- 2011, Las Vegas, Nevada, United States, 19–23 September 2011
- 2010, Chicago, Illinois, United States, 20–24 September 2010
- 2009, Beijing, China, 20–25 September 2009
- 2008, San Francisco, California, United States, 13–19 September 2008
- 2007, Montreal, Quebec, Canada, 9–14 September 2007
- 2006, Los Angeles, California, United States, 23–29 September 2006
- 2005, Cologne, Germany, 28 August – 2 September 2005
- 2004, Philadelphia, Pennsylvania, United States, 26 September – 1 October 2004
- 2003, San Diego, California, United States, 14–19 September 2003
- 2002, Atlanta, Georgia, United States, 23–26 September 2002
- 2001, Rome, Italy, 16–21 July 2001
- 2000, Boston, Massachusetts, United States, 6–11 August 2000
- 1999, Seattle, Washington, United States, 15–20 August 1999
- 1998, Dallas, Texas, United States, 25–30 October 1998
- 1997, Budapest, Hungary, 26–30 September 1997
- 1996, Rye, New York, United States, 10–12 November 1996
- 1995, Berkeley, California, United States, 13–15 November 1995
